

Deaths in June

 4: John Wooden
 21: With Approval

Current sporting seasons

Australian rules football 2010

Australian Football League

Auto racing 2010

Formula One
Sprint Cup

IRL IndyCar Series
World Rally Championship
Formula Two
Nationwide Series
Camping World Truck Series
GP2 Series
GP3 Series
WTTC
V8 Supercar
American Le Mans
Le Mans Series

Superleague Formula
Rolex Sports Car Series
FIA GT1 World Championship
Formula Three
Auto GP
World Series by Renault
Deutsche Tourenwagen Masters
Super GT

Baseball 2010

Major League Baseball
Nippon Professional Baseball

Basketball 2010

WNBA

Philippines
Fiesta Conference

Cricket 2010

England:
County Championship
Clydesdale Bank 40
Friends Provident t20

Association football 2010

National teams competitions
FIFA World Cup
2011 FIFA Women's World Cup qualification (UEFA)
2011 UEFA European Under-21 Championship qualification

International clubs competitions

Copa Libertadores (South America)

AFC (Asia) Champions League
AFC Cup
CAF (Africa) Champions League
CAF Confederation Cup

Domestic (national) competitions

Brazil

Japan
Norway
Russia

Major League Soccer (USA & Canada)
Women's Professional Soccer (USA)

Golf 2010

PGA Tour
European Tour
LPGA Tour
Champions Tour

Lacrosse 2010

Major League Lacrosse

Motorcycle racing 2010

Moto GP
Superbike World Championship
Supersport racing

Rugby league 2010

Super League
NRL

Rugby union 2010

2011 Rugby World Cup qualifying

Days of the month

June 30, 2010 (Wednesday)

Cricket
Australia in England:
4th ODI in London:
 290/5 (50 overs);  212 (42.4 overs). Australia win by 78 runs; England lead 5-match series 3–1.

Football (soccer)
UEFA Champions League:
First qualifying round, first leg: Tre Fiori  0–3  Rudar Pljevlja
 Women's Professional Soccer:
 WPS All-Star 2010 in Kennesaw, Georgia:
 Marta's XI 5, Abby's XI 2

Tennis
Grand Slams:
Wimbledon Championships in Wimbledon, London, United Kingdom:
Men's singles, quarter-finals:
Tomáš Berdych  [12] def. Roger Federer  [1] 6–4, 3–6, 6–1, 6–4
Rafael Nadal  [2] def. Robin Söderling  [6] 3–6, 6–3, 7–6(4), 6–1
Novak Djokovic  [3] def. Lu Yen-hsun  6–3, 6–2, 6–2
Andy Murray  [4] def. Jo-Wilfried Tsonga  [10] 6–7(5), 7–6(5), 6–2, 6–2

Volleyball
FIVB World League, Week 5:  (teams in bold advance to final round)
Pool D:  3–1 
Standings:  18 points (8 matches), Germany 16 (9),  15 (8), Argentina 2 (9).

June 29, 2010 (Tuesday)

Baseball
 College World Series Final in Omaha, Nebraska (best-of-3 series):
 South Carolina 2, UCLA 1 (11 innings). South Carolina wins series 2–0.
 The Gamecocks win their first NCAA title in baseball, and their first NCAA team title in any men's sport.

Cricket
South Africa in West Indies:
3rd Test in Bridgetown, Barbados, Day 4:
 231 (73.5 overs) and 161 (65.1 overs);  346 (134.4 overs) and 49/3 (8.4 overs). South Africa win by 7 wickets; win 3-match series 2–0.

Football (soccer)
FIFA World Cup in South Africa:
Round of 16:
In Pretoria:  0–0 (5–3 pen.) 
Paraguay reach the quarter-finals for the first time, and join Uruguay, Argentina and Brazil for a record of four South American teams in the last eight.
In Cape Town:  1–0 
UEFA Champions League:
First qualifying round, first leg: FC Santa Coloma  –  Birkirkara
The match is postponed due to bad pitch conditions. Match awarded to Birkirkara 3–0.

Tennis
Grand Slams:
Wimbledon Championships in Wimbledon, London, United Kingdom:
Women's singles, quarter-finals:
Serena Williams  [1] def. Li Na  [9] 7–5, 6–3
Tsvetana Pironkova  def. Venus Williams  [2] 6–2, 6–3
Vera Zvonareva  [21] def. Kim Clijsters  [8] 6–3, 4–6, 6–2
Petra Kvitová  def. Kaia Kanepi  4–6, 7–6(8), 8–6

June 28, 2010 (Monday)

Baseball
 College World Series Final in Omaha, Nebraska (best-of-3 series):
 South Carolina 7, UCLA 1. South Carolina leads series 1–0.

Beach handball
World Championships in Antalya, Turkey:
Men:
3rd/4th Place: Egypt  1–2   Turkey
Final:  Brazil  2–0   Hungary
Brazil win the championship for the second time.
Women:
3rd/4th Place:  Brazil  2–0  Ukraine
Final:  Denmark  0–2   Norway
Norway win the championship for the first time.

Cricket
South Africa in West Indies:
3rd Test in Bridgetown, Barbados, Day 3:
 231 (73.5 overs) and 134/7 (57 overs);  346 (134.4 overs). West Indies lead by 19 runs with 3 wickets remaining.

Football (soccer)
FIFA World Cup in South Africa:
Round of 16:
In Durban:  2–1 
The Netherlands score four wins in a World Cup tournament for the first time since 1974.
In Johannesburg:  3–0 
Brazil reach the quarterfinals for the fifth straight time.

Tennis
Grand Slams:
Wimbledon Championships in Wimbledon, London, United Kingdom:
Men's singles, fourth round:
Roger Federer  [1] def. Jürgen Melzer  [16] 6–3, 6–2, 6–3
Rafael Nadal  [2] def. Paul-Henri Mathieu  6–4, 6–2, 6–2
Novak Djokovic  [3] def. Lleyton Hewitt  [15] 7–5, 6–4, 3–6, 6–4
Andy Murray  [4] def. Sam Querrey  [18] 7–5, 6–3, 6–4
Lu Yen-hsun  def. Andy Roddick  [5] 4–6, 7–6(3), 7–6(4), 6–7(5), 9–7
Robin Söderling  [6] def. David Ferrer  [9] 6–2, 5–7, 6–2, 3–6, 7–5
Jo-Wilfried Tsonga  [10] def. Julien Benneteau  [32] 6–1, 6–4, 3–6, 6–1
Tomáš Berdych  [12] def. Daniel Brands  4–6, 7–6(1), 7–5, 6–3
Women's singles, fourth round:
Serena Williams  [1] def. Maria Sharapova  [16] 7–6(9), 6–4
Venus Williams  [2] def. Jarmila Groth  6–4, 7–6(5)
Petra Kvitová  def. Caroline Wozniacki  [3] 6–2, 6–0
Vera Zvonareva  [21] def. Jelena Janković  [4] 6–1, 3–0 retired
Li Na  [9] def. Agnieszka Radwańska  [7] 6–3, 6–2
Kim Clijsters  [8] def. Justine Henin  [17] 2–6, 6–2, 6–3
Tsvetana Pironkova  def. Marion Bartoli  [11] 6–4, 6–4
Kaia Kanepi  def. Klára Zakopalová  6–2, 6–4

June 27, 2010 (Sunday)

Auto racing
Formula One:
European Grand Prix in Valencia, Spain:
(1) Sebastian Vettel  (Red Bull–Renault) (2) Lewis Hamilton  (McLaren–Mercedes) (3) Jenson Button  (McLaren-Mercedes)
Drivers' championship standings (after 9 of 19 races): (1) Hamilton 127 points (2) Button 121 (3) Vettel 115
Constructors' championship standings: (1) McLaren 248 points (2) Red Bull 218 (3) Ferrari 165
NASCAR Sprint Cup Series:
Lenox Industrial Tools 301 in Loudon, New Hampshire:
(1)  Jimmie Johnson (Chevrolet; Hendrick Motorsports) (2)  Tony Stewart (Chevrolet; Stewart Haas Racing) (3)  Kurt Busch (Dodge; Penske Racing)
Drivers' championship standings (after 17 of 36 races): (1)  Kevin Harvick (Chevrolet; Richard Childress Racing) 2489 points (2) Johnson 2384 (3)  Kyle Busch (Toyota; Joe Gibbs Racing) 2328

Badminton
Europe Cup in Zwolle, Netherlands:
Final: Favorite-Ramenskoe  2–4  1. BC Saarbrücken
Saarbrücken win the championship for the first time.

Cricket
South Africa in West Indies:
3rd Test in Bridgetown, Barbados, Day 2:
 231 (73.5 overs);  285/6 (104 overs). South Africa lead by 54 runs with 4 wickets remaining in the 1st innings.
Australia in England:
3rd ODI in Manchester:
 212 (46 overs);  214/9 (49.1 overs). England win by 1 wicket; lead 5-match series 3–0.

Equestrianism
Show jumping:
British Jumping Derby in Hickstead:  Guy Williams  on Skip Two Ramiro  Tina Fletcher  on Promised Land  six third-placed riders/horses, in the fastest time: Andre Thieme  on Nacorde

Football (soccer)
FIFA World Cup in South Africa:
Round of 16:
In Bloemfontein:  4–1 
Germany reach the last 8 for the 15th straight time and 16th overall.
In Johannesburg:  3–1 
Argentina and Germany will meet in the quarterfinal for the second successive time.

Golf
Women's majors:
LPGA Championship Presented by Wegmans in Pittsford, New York, United States:
Final leaderboard: (1) Cristie Kerr  269 (–19) (2) Song-Hee Kim  281 (–7) (3) Ai Miyazato  & Jiyai Shin  283 (–5)
Kerr wins the tournament by twelve strokes, claiming her second major and fourteenth LPGA Tour title.
PGA Tour:
Travelers Championship in Cromwell, Connecticut:
Winner: Bubba Watson  266 (−14)PO
Watson wins his first PGA Tour title on the second playoff hole.
European Tour:
BMW International Open in Germany:
Winner: David Horsey  270 (−18)
Horsey wins his first European Tour title.
Champions Tour:
Dick's Sporting Goods Open in Endicott, New York:
Winner: Loren Roberts  201 (−15)
Roberts wins his twelfth Champions Tour title.

Horse racing
Irish Derby in County Kildare (all horses trained by Aidan O'Brien):
(1) Cape Blanco (jockey: Johnny Murtagh) (2) Midas Touch (jockey: Colm O'Donoghue) (3) Jan Vermeer (jockey: Seamie Heffernan)

Motorcycle racing
Superbike:
Misano Superbike World Championship round in Misano Adriatico, Italy:
Race 1: (1) Max Biaggi  (Aprilia RSV 4) (2) Carlos Checa  (Ducati 1098R) (3) Troy Corser  (BMW S1000RR)
Race 2: (1) Biaggi (2) Leon Haslam  (Suzuki GSX-R1000) (3) Michel Fabrizio  (Ducati 1098R)
Riders' championship standings (after 8 of 13 rounds): (1) Biaggi 307 points (2) Haslam 270 (3) Checa 172
Manufacturers' championship standings: (1) Aprilia 313 points (2) Suzuki 283 (3) Ducati 250
Supersport:
Misano Supersport World Championship round in Misano Adriatico, Italy:
(1) Eugene Laverty  (Honda CBR600RR) (2) Joan Lascorz  (Kawasaki Ninja ZX-6R) (3) Kenan Sofuoğlu  (Honda CBR600RR)
Riders' championship standings (after 8 of 13 rounds): (1) Laverty 161 points (2) Sofuoğlu 158 (3) Lascorz 148
Manufacturers' championship standings: (1) Honda 195 points (2) Kawasaki 148 (3) Triumph 107

Snooker
Players Tour Championship
Event 1 in Sheffield, England:
Final: Mark Williams  def. Stephen Maguire  4–0

Volleyball
FIVB World League, Week 4: (teams in bold advance to final round, teams in strike are eliminated)
Pool A:
 2–3 
 3–1 
Standings (after 8 matches): Brazil, Bulgaria 19 points, Netherlands 10, South Korea 0.
Pool B:
 2–3 
 1–3 
Standings (after 8 matches): Serbia 20 points, Italy 18, France 6, China 4.
Pool D:  3–1 
Standings (after 8 matches):  18 points, Poland 15,  13, Argentina 2.
Men's European League, Week 4:
Pool A:  3–2 
Standings (after 8 matches):  14 points, Spain 13,  11, Slovakia 10.
Pool B:
 3–1 
 3–1 
Standings (after 8 matches): Portugal 16 points, Turkey 13, Greece, Austria 9.
Women's European League, Week 4:
Pool B:
 3–2 
 3–0  (technical win)
Standings (after 6 matches): Turkey 11 points, Spain 10, Israel 8, Greece 7.

June 26, 2010 (Saturday)

Auto racing
Nationwide Series:
New England 200 in Loudon, New Hampshire: (1)  Kyle Busch (Toyota; Joe Gibbs Racing) (2)  Brad Keselowski (Dodge; Penske Racing) (3)  Carl Edwards (Ford; Roush Fenway Racing)
Drivers' championship standings (after 16 of 35 races): (1) Keselowski 2641 points (2) Edwards 2394 (3)  Justin Allgaier (Dodge; Penske Racing) 2201

Badminton
Europe Cup in Zwolle, Netherlands:
Quarterfinals: 1. BC Saarbrücken  4–0  Soderinsa Rinconada
Semifinals:
Favorite-Ramenskoe  4–0  Issy Les Moulineaux
1. BC Saarbrücken  4–2  Nizhni Novgorod

Cricket
South Africa in West Indies:
3rd Test in Bridgetown, Barbados, Day 1:
 231 (73.5 overs);  46/2 (14 overs). South Africa trail by 185 runs with 8 wickets remaining in the 1st innings.

Equestrianism
Show jumping:
Global Champions Tour:
5th Competition in Monte Carlo:   Bernardo Alves  on Bridgit  Jessica Kürten  on Libertina  Jos Lansink  on Valentina van't Heike
Standings (after 5 of 9 competitions): (1) Marco Kutscher  138 points (2) Kürten 137 (3) Lansink 126
FEI Nations Cup Promotional League:
FEI Nations Cup of Norway in Drammen (CSIO 3*):   (Stein Endresen on Hoyo de Monterey, Geir Gulliksen on L'Espoir, Connie Bull on Cézanne, Morten Djupvik on Bessemeind's Casino)   (Roberto Cristofoletti on Las Vegas, Alberto Cocconi on Magellan D'Uthah, Gabriele Grassi on American Blu van Eeklelchem, Emilio Bicocchi on Kapitol D'Argonne)   (Pieter Devos on Utopia van den Donkhoeve, Rik Hemeryck on Quarco de Kerambars, Kevin Gielen on Robbedoes, Niels Bruynseels on Carpalo)
Standings (after 10 of 12 competitions): (1)  55.5 points (2)  54 (3)  39

Football (soccer)
FIFA World Cup in South Africa:
Round of 16:
In Port Elizabeth:  2–1 
Uruguay advance to the quarter-finals for the first time since 1970.
In Rustenburg:  1–2 (a.e.t.) 
Ghana reach the quarter-finals for the first time and become the third African team to do so.
UEFA U-17 Women's Championship in Nyon, Switzerland: (teams in bold qualify for FIFA U-17 Women's World Cup)
Third place match:  0–3  
Final:   0–0 (4–1 pen.)  
Spain win the Championship for the first time.

Golf
Women's majors:
LPGA Championship Presented by Wegmans in Pittsford, New York, United States:
Leaderboard after third round: (1) Cristie Kerr  203 (–13) (2) Jimin Kang , Azahara Muñoz  & Mika Miyazato  211 (–5)

Handball
American Men's Handball Championship in Santiago, Chile: (teams in bold qualify for 2011 World Championship)
7th/8th place:  22–33 
5th/6th place:  30–27 
3rd/4th place:   34–31 
Final:   27–28  
Argentina win the Championship for the fourth time.

Motorcycle racing
Moto GP:
Dutch TT in Assen, Netherlands:
MotoGP: (1) Jorge Lorenzo  (Yamaha) (2) Dani Pedrosa  (Honda) (3) Casey Stoner  (Ducati)
Riders' championship standings (after 6 of 18 rounds): (1) Lorenzo 140 points (2) Pedrosa 93 (3) Andrea Dovizioso  (Honda) 89
Manufacturers' championship standings: (1) Yamaha 145 points (2) Honda 117 (3) Ducati 81
Moto2: (1) Andrea Iannone  (Speed Up) (2) Toni Elías  (Moriwaki) (3) Thomas Lüthi  (Moriwaki)
Riders' championship standings (after 6 of 17 rounds): (1) Elías 100 points (2) Shoya Tomizawa  (Suter) 76 (3) Lüthi 74
Manufacturers' championship standings: (1) Moriwaki 116 points (2) Suter 111 (3) Speed Up 81
125cc: (1) Marc Márquez  (Derbi) (2) Nicolás Terol  (Aprilia) (3) Pol Espargaró  (Derbi)
Riders' championship standings (after 6 of 17 rounds): (1) Terol 118 points (2) Espargaró 115 (3) Márquez 107
Manufacturers' championship standings: (1) Derbi 145 points (2) Aprilia 121 (3) Honda 7

Rugby union
IRB Pacific Nations Cup:
 26–23  in Apia
 9–31  in Apia
Final standings: Samoa, Fiji 9 points, Japan 8, Tonga 4.
Samoa win the Cup for the first time.
Mid-year Tests:
Week 5:
 29–10  in Hamilton
 22–15  in Brisbane
 55–11  in East London
 41–13  in Buenos Aires

Tennis
Grand Slams:
Wimbledon Championships in Wimbledon, London, United Kingdom:
Men's singles, third round:
Rafael Nadal  [2] def. Philipp Petzschner  [33] 6–4, 4–6, 6–7(5), 6–2, 6–3
Andy Murray  [4] def. Gilles Simon  [26] 6–1, 6–4, 6–4
Robin Söderling  [6] def. Thomaz Bellucci  [25] 6–4, 6–2, 7–5
David Ferrer  [9] def. Jérémy Chardy  7–5, 6–3, 4–6, 3–6, 7–5
Jo-Wilfried Tsonga  [10] def. Tobias Kamke  6–1, 6–4, 7–6(1)
Women's singles, third round:
Serena Williams  [1] def. Dominika Cibulková  6–0, 7–5
Caroline Wozniacki  [3] def. Anastasia Pavlyuchenkova  [29] 7–5, 6–4
Agnieszka Radwańska  [7] def. Sara Errani  [32] 6–3, 6–1
Li Na  [9] def. Anastasia Rodionova  6–1, 6–3
Klára Zakopalová  def. Flavia Pennetta  [10] 6–2, 6–3

Volleyball
FIVB World League, Week 4: (teams in bold advance to final round, teams in strike are eliminated)
Pool A:
 1–3 
 3–0 
Standings (after 7 matches): Brazil 17 points, Bulgaria 16, Netherlands 9, South Korea 0.
Pool B:  1–3 
Standings (after 7 matches): Serbia 18 points,  15,  6, China 3.
Pool C:
 0–3 
 3–1 
Standings (after 8 matches): Russia 23 points, United States 16, Finland 6, Egypt 3.
Pool D:
 1–3 
 3–1 
Standings: Cuba 18 points (8 matches), Germany 13 (8), Poland 12 (7), Argentina 2 (7).
Men's European League, Week 4:
Pool A:
 3–1 
 3–2 
Standings: Romania 14 points (8 matches), Spain 11 (7), Great Britain 11 (8), Slovakia 9 (7).
Pool B:
 3–0 
 3–1 
Standings (after 7 matches): Portugal 14 points, Turkey 11, Greece 9, Austria 8.
Women's European League, Week 4:
Pool A:
 3–0 
 1–3 
Standings: Romania 12 points (8 matches), Serbia, Bulgaria 11 (6), Great Britain 8 (8).
Pool B:
 3–0 
 3–0  (technical win)
All four matches between Turkey and Israel were cancelled due to political tension between the countries. The results were set as 3–0 for the home teams.
Standings (after 5 matches): Turkey 9 points, Spain 8, Israel 7, Greece 6.
Women's Pan-American Cup in Rosarito and Tijuana, Mexico:
Classification 7–8:  1–3 
Classification 5–6:  3–0 
Classification 3–4:   3–0 
Final:   3–0  
Dominican Republic win the Cup for the second time.

June 25, 2010 (Friday)

Baseball
Major League Baseball
Edwin Jackson of the Arizona Diamondbacks hurled the fourth no-hitter of the season as he beat the Tampa Bay Rays, 1–0.

Football (soccer)
FIFA World Cup in South Africa: (teams in bold advance to the round of 16)
Group G:
In Durban:  0–3 
In Nelspruit:  0–0 
Final standings: Brazil 7 points, Portugal 5, Côte d'Ivoire 4, Korea DPR 0.
Group H:
In Pretoria:  1–2 
Chile advance beyond the first round for the first time since 1962.
In Bloemfontein:  0–0 
Final standings: Spain, Chile 6 points, Switzerland 4, Honduras 1.
After the conclusion of the first stage, all five South American teams advance to the Round of 16, while a record of seven European teams (out of 13) are eliminated.

Golf
Women's majors:
LPGA Championship Presented by Wegmans in Pittsford, New York, United States:
Leaderboard after second round: (1) Cristie Kerr  134 (–10) (2) Mika Miyazato  & Inbee Park  139 (–5)

Handball
American Men's Handball Championship in Santiago, Chile:
5th–8th place:
 24–28 
 38–36 (OT) 
Semifinals:
 33–21 
 17–8 
Play is suspended due to a bomb alarm inside the hall. Argentina is declared the winner.
Brazil and Argentina both advance to the final for the fifth straight time, and qualify for 2011 World Championship.

Ice hockey
NHL Entry Draft in Los Angeles, California:
The Edmonton Oilers select left winger Taylor Hall of the Windsor Spitfires, with the first overall draft pick.

Tennis
Grand Slams:
Wimbledon Championships in Wimbledon, London, United Kingdom:
Men's singles, third round:
Roger Federer  [1] def. Arnaud Clément  6–2, 6–4, 6–2
Novak Djokovic  [3] def. Albert Montañés  [28] 6–1, 6–4, 6–4
Andy Roddick  [5] def. Philipp Kohlschreiber  [29] 7–5, 6–7(5), 6–3, 6–3
Women's singles, third round:
Venus Williams  [2] def. Alisa Kleybanova  [26] 6–4, 6–2
Jelena Janković  [4] def. Alona Bondarenko  [28] 6–0, 6–3
Kim Clijsters  [8] def. Maria Kirilenko  [27] 6–3, 6–3

Volleyball
FIVB World League, Week 4: (teams in bold advance to final round)
Pool B:  3–2 
Standings:  15 points (6 matches), Italy 15 (7), France 6 (7),  3 (6).
Pool C:
 0–3 
 2–3 
Standings (after 7 matches): Russia 20 points, United States 13, Finland 6, Egypt 3.
Pool D:  2–3 
Standings: Cuba 15 points (7 matches), Germany 13 (7),  9 (6),  2 (6).
Men's European League, Week 4:
Pool A:  3–0 
Standings: Romania 12 points (7 matches), Great Britain 10 (7),  9 (6),  8 (6).
Women's European League, Week 4:
Pool A:
 3–1 
 3–2 
Standings: Serbia 10 points (5 matches), Romania 10 (7), Bulgaria 9 (5), Great Britain 7 (7).
Women's Pan-American Cup in Rosarito and Tijuana, Mexico:
Classification 9:  3–1 
Classification 5–8:
 3–2 
 2–3 
Semifinals:
 0–3 
 1–3

June 24, 2010 (Thursday)

Basketball
NBA Draft in New York City:
The Washington Wizards select Kentucky Wildcats freshman John Wall with the first overall pick. Fellow Wildcats DeMarcus Cousins (5th, Sacramento Kings), Patrick Patterson (14th, Houston Rockets), Eric Bledsoe (18th, Oklahoma City Thunder) and Daniel Orton (29th, Orlando Magic) are also drafted in the first round, making Kentucky the first school to have five players drafted in the first round in any NBA Draft.

Cricket
Asia Cup in Dambulla, Sri Lanka:
Final:  268/6 (50 overs);  187 (44.4 overs). India win by 81 runs.
India wins the Cup for the fifth time.
Australia in England:
2nd ODI in Cardiff:
 239/7 (50 overs);  243/6 (45.2 overs). England win by 4 wickets; lead 5-match series 2–0.

Football (soccer)
FIFA World Cup in South Africa: (teams in bold advance to the round of 16)
Group E:
In Rustenburg:  1–3 
In Cape Town:  1–2 
Final standings: Netherlands 9 points, Japan 6, Denmark 3, Cameroon 0.
Group F:
In Johannesburg:  3–2 
Italy, the defending champion, fail to advance beyond the first round for the first time since 1974.
In Polokwane:  0–0 
Final standings: Paraguay 5 points, Slovakia 4, New Zealand 3, Italy 2.
2011 FIFA Women's World Cup qualification (UEFA): (teams in strike are eliminated)
Group 3:  0–1 
Standings: Denmark 19 points (7 matches), Scotland 15 (6),  9 (6),  4 (6),  0 (7).
Group 4:  1–0 
Standings: Poland 16 points (7 matches),  12 (7),  11 (6),  8 (6), Bosnia and Herzegovina 0 (8).
Group 5:  9–0 
Standings: Spain 19 points (8 matches),  16 (6),  9 (6),  6 (6), Malta 0 (8).
Group 6:  4–0 
Standings:  18 points (7 matches), Russia 15 (6),  9 (6), Israel 6 (7),  0 (5)

Golf
Women's majors:
LPGA Championship Presented by Wegmans in Pittsford, New York, United States:
Leaderboard after first round (USA unless indicated): (1) Cristie Kerr, Seon Hwa Lee  & Stacy Lewis 68 (–4)

Handball
American Men's Handball Championship in Santiago, Chile: (teams in bold advance to semifinals)
Group A:
 29–32 
 26–18 
Final standings: Argentina 6 points, Chile, Uruguay 3, Canada 0.
Group B:
 41–26 
 25–20 
Final standings: Brazil 6 points, Cuba 4, Greenland 2, Dominican Republic 0.

Tennis
Grand Slams:
Wimbledon Championships in Wimbledon, London, United Kingdom:
Men's singles, first round:
John Isner  [23] def. Nicolas Mahut  6–4, 3–6, 6–7(7), 7–6(3), 70–68
After 11 hours and 5 minutes, Isner advances to the second round to play Thiemo de Bakker .
Men's singles, second round:
Rafael Nadal  [2] def. Robin Haase  5–7, 6–2, 3–6, 6–0, 6–3
Andy Murray  [4] def. Jarkko Nieminen  6–3, 6–4, 6–2
Robin Söderling  [6] def. Marcel Granollers  7–5, 6–1, 6–4
David Ferrer  [9] def. Florent Serra  6–3, 7–5, 6–7(6), 6–3
Jo-Wilfried Tsonga  [10] def. Alexandr Dolgopolov  6–4, 6–4, 6–7(5), 5–7, 10–8
Women's singles, second round:
Serena Williams  [1] def. Anna Chakvetadze  6–0, 6–1
Caroline Wozniacki  [3] def. Chang Kai-chen  6–4, 6–3
Agnieszka Radwańska  [7] def. Alberta Brianti  6–2, 6–0
Li Na  [9] def. Kurumi Nara  6–2, 6–4
Flavia Pennetta  [10] def. Monica Niculescu  6–1, 6–1

Volleyball
Women's Pan-American Cup in Rosarito and Tijuana, Mexico:
Classification 5–10:
 0–3 
 0–3 
Quarterfinals:
 3–0 
 3–1

June 23, 2010 (Wednesday)

Baseball
 Major League Baseball news:
 The Florida Marlins fire their manager Fredi González, becoming the third team to do so this season. Edwin Rodríguez, previously the manager of the New Orleans Zephyrs, the Marlins' Triple-A affiliate, is named interim manager for the remainder of the season. (ESPN)

Football (soccer)
FIFA World Cup in South Africa: (teams in bold advance to the round of 16)
Group C:
In Port Elizabeth:  0–1 
In Pretoria:  1–0 
Final standings: United States, England 5 points, Slovenia 4, Algeria 1.
Group D:
In Johannesburg:  0–1 
In Nelspruit:  2–1 
Final standings: Germany 6 points, Ghana, Australia 4, Serbia 3.
2011 FIFA Women's World Cup qualification (UEFA): (teams in bold advance to qualification play-offs, teams in strike are eliminated)
Group 1:
 0–6 
 0–0 
Standings: France 24 points (8 matches),  21 (8), Estonia 9 (7), Serbia 8 (8), Northern Ireland 4 (7),  1 (8)
Group 2:
 1–6 
 3–0 
Standings: Norway 16 points (6 matches), 14 (7),  Belarus 10 (6), Slovakia 6 (6), Macedonia 0 (7).
Group 4:  0–0 
Standings:  13 points (6 matches),  12 (7), Ukraine 11 (6), Romania 8 (6),  0 (7).
Group 5:  3–0 
Standings:  16 points (6 matches),  16 (7), Austria 9 (6), Turkey 6 (6),  0 (7).
Group 6:  2–4 
Standings: Switzerland 18 points (7 matches),  12 (5),  9 (6),  6 (6), Kazakhstan 0 (5)
Group 7:
 1–0 
 1–3 
Standings: Italy 22 points (8 matches), Finland 16 (7), Portugal 9 (7), Slovenia 6 (7),  0 (7).
Group 8:  17–0 
Standings: Sweden 16 points (6 matches),  10 (6),  10 (8),  6 (6), Azerbaijan 4 (6).

Handball
American Men's Handball Championship in Santiago, Chile: (teams in bold advance to semifinals, teams in strike are eliminated)
Group A:
 12–39 
 27–27 
Standings (after 2 matches): Argentina 4 points, Chile 3, Uruguay 1, Canada 0.
Group B:
 32–25 
 30–17 
Standings (after 2 matches): Cuba, Brazil 4 points, Greenland, Dominican Republic 0.

Rugby union
Mid-year Tests:
Week 5: New Zealand Māori XV  35–28  England XV

Tennis
Grand Slams:
Wimbledon Championships in Wimbledon, London, United Kingdom:
Men's singles, first round:
Nicolas Mahut  vs. John Isner  [23] 4–6, 6–3, 7–6(7), 6–7(3), 59–59 (play suspended)
In the longest professional tennis match in history, Mahut and Isner are prevented from completing their match for a second consecutive day, due to fading light, after almost 10 hours of play.
Men's singles, second round:
Roger Federer  [1] def. Ilija Bozoljac  6–3, 6–7(4), 6–4, 7–6(5)
Novak Djokovic  [3] def. Taylor Dent  7–6(5), 6–1, 6–4
Andy Roddick  [5] def. Michaël Llodra  4–6, 6–4, 6–1, 7–6(2)
Daniel Brands  def. Nikolay Davydenko  [7] 1–6, 7–6(5), 7–6(8), 6–1
Women's singles, second round:
Venus Williams  [2] def. Ekaterina Makarova  6–0, 6–4
Jelena Janković  [4] def. Aleksandra Wozniak  4–6, 6–2, 6–4
Kim Clijsters  [8] def. Karolina Šprem  6–3, 6–2

June 22, 2010 (Tuesday)

Cricket
South Africa in West Indies:
2nd Test in Basseterre, St Kitts, Day 5:
 543/6d (147 overs) and 235/3d (94 overs);  546 (181.1 overs). Match drawn; South Africa lead 3-match series 1–0.
Asia Cup in Dambulla, Sri Lanka:
Group stage: (teams in bold advance to final)
 209 (42.3 overs);  211/3 (37.3 overs). Sri Lanka win by 7 wickets.
Final standings: Sri Lanka 14 points, India 9,  5,  0.
Australia in England:
1st ODI in Southampton:
 267/7 (50 overs);  268/6 (46 overs; Eoin Morgan 103*). England win by 4 wickets; lead 5-match series 1–0.

Football (soccer)
FIFA World Cup in South Africa: (teams in bold advance to the round of 16)
Group A:
In Rustenburg:  0–1 
In Bloemfontein:  1–2 
Final standings: Uruguay 7 points, Mexico, South Africa 4, France 1.
South Africa become the first World Cup host team to fail to advance past the opening round.
Group B:
In Durban:  2–2 
In Polokwane:  0–2 
Final standings: Argentina 9 points, Korea Republic 4, Greece 3, Nigeria 1.
2011 FIFA Women's World Cup qualification (UEFA): (teams in strike are eliminated)
Group 1:  3–0 
Standings:  21 points (7 matches), Iceland 21 (8),  9 (6),  7 (7),  3 (6), Croatia 1 (8)
UEFA U-17 Women's Championship:
Semifinals:
 0–3 
 1–0

Handball
American Men's Handball Championship in Santiago, Chile:
Group A:
 32–14 
 25–36 
Group B:
 29–23 
 35–19

Tennis
Grand Slams:
Wimbledon Championships in Wimbledon, London, United Kingdom:
Men's singles, first round:
Rafael Nadal  [2] def. Kei Nishikori  6–2, 6–4, 6–4
Andy Murray  [4] def. Jan Hájek  7–5, 6–1, 6–2
Robin Söderling  [6] def. Robby Ginepri  6–2, 6–2, 6–3
Fabio Fognini  def. Fernando Verdasco  [8] 7–6(9), 6–2, 6–7(6), 6–4
David Ferrer  [9] def. Nicolas Kiefer  6–4, 6–2, 6–3
Jo-Wilfried Tsonga  [10] def. Robert Kendrick  7–6(2), 7–6(6), 3–6, 6–4
Women's singles, first round:
Serena Williams  [1] def. Michelle Larcher de Brito  6–0, 6–4
Caroline Wozniacki  [3] def. Tathiana Garbin  6–1, 6–1
Kaia Kanepi  def. Samantha Stosur  [6] 6–4, 6–4
Agnieszka Radwańska  [7] def. Melinda Czink  6–3, 6–3
Li Na  [9] def. Chanelle Scheepers  7–6(5), 6–2
Flavia Pennetta  [10] def. Anabel Medina Garrigues  6–4, 6–0

Volleyball
Women's Pan-American Cup in Rosarito and Tijuana, Mexico: (teams in bold advance to the semifinals; teams in italic advance to the quarterfinals playoffs)
Group A:
 3–1 
 3–1 
Final standings: Cuba 8 points, Dominican Republic 7, Argentina 6, Brazil 5, Canada 4.
Group B:
 0–3 
 3–0 
 3–0 
Final standings: United States 10 points, Peru 9, Puerto Rico 8, Trinidad and Tobago 7, Mexico 6, Costa Rica 5.

June 21, 2010 (Monday)

Cricket
South Africa in West Indies:
2nd Test in Basseterre, St Kitts, Day 4:
 543/6d (147 overs) and 23/0 (11 overs);  546 (181.1 overs; Shivnarine Chanderpaul 166). South Africa lead by 20 runs with 10 wickets remaining.
During the West Indies innings, Mark Boucher became the first wicket-keeper to reach 500 Test dismissals in a career.
Asia Cup in Dambulla, Sri Lanka:
Group stage: (teams in bold advance to final, teams in strike are eliminated)
 385/7 (50 overs; Shahid Afridi 124);  246/5 (50 overs). Pakistan win by 139 runs.
Standings: ,  9 points (2 matches), Pakistan 5 (3), Bangladesh 0 (3).

Football (soccer)
FIFA World Cup in South Africa:  (team in bold advances to the round of 16, team in strike is eliminated)
Group G in Cape Town:  7–0 
Standings (after 2 matches):  6 points, Portugal 4,  1, Korea DPR 0.
Group H:
In Port Elizabeth:  1–0 
Switzerland set a World Cup finals record for the longest consecutive streak without conceding a goal, with the streak being ended at 559 minutes.
In Johannesburg:  2–0 
Standings (after 2 matches): Chile 6 points, Spain, Switzerland 3, Honduras 0.

Rugby union
IRB Junior World Championship
3rd place play-off:  22–27  
Final:   17–62  
New Zealand win the Championship for the third consecutive time.

Tennis
Grand Slams:
Wimbledon Championships in Wimbledon, London, United Kingdom:
Men's singles, first round:
Roger Federer  [1] def. Alejandro Falla  5–7, 4–6, 6–4, 7–6(1), 6–0
Novak Djokovic  [3] def. Olivier Rochus  4–6, 6–2, 3–6, 6–4, 6–2
Andy Roddick  [5] def. Rajeev Ram  6–3, 6–2, 6–2
Nikolay Davydenko  [7] def. Kevin Anderson  3–6, 6–7(3), 7–6(3), 7–5, 9–7
Women's singles, first round:
Venus Williams  [2] def. Rossana de los Ríos  6–3, 6–2
Jelena Janković  [4] def. Laura Robson  6–3, 7–6(5)
Vera Dushevina  def. Francesca Schiavone  [5] 6–7(0), 7–5, 6–1
Kim Clijsters  [8] def. Maria Elena Camerin  6–0, 6–3

Volleyball
Women's Pan-American Cup in Rosarito and Tijuana, Mexico:
Group A:
 0–3 
 1–3 
Standings: Cuba 6 points (3 matches), Dominican Republic, Argentina 5 (3), Brazil 5 (4), Canada 3 (3).
Group B:
 0–3 
 3–0 
 0–3 
Standings (after 4 matches): United States 8 points, Peru 7, Puerto Rico, Trinidad and Tobago 6, Mexico 5, Costa Rica 4.

June 20, 2010 (Sunday)

Athletics
European Team Championships Super League in Bergen, Norway
Final standings: (1)  379.5 points (2)  317 (3)  304.5

Auto racing
NASCAR Sprint Cup Series:
Toyota/Save Mart 350 in Sonoma, California:
(1)  Jimmie Johnson (Chevrolet; Hendrick Motorsports) (2)  Robby Gordon (Toyota; Robby Gordon Motorsports) (3)  Kevin Harvick (Chevrolet; Richard Childress Racing)
Drivers' championship standings (after 16 of 36 races): (1) Harvick 2334 points (2) Johnson 2194 (3)  Kyle Busch (Toyota; Joe Gibbs Racing) 2193
IndyCar Series:
Iowa Corn Indy 250 in Newton, Iowa:
(1) Tony Kanaan  (Andretti Autosport) (2) Hélio Castroneves  (Team Penske) (3) E. J. Viso  (KV Racing Technology)
Drivers' championship standings (after 8 of 17 races): (1) Will Power  (Team Penske) 274 points (2) Scott Dixon  (Chip Ganassi Racing) 263 (3) Dario Franchitti  (Chip Ganassi Racing) 260
V8 Supercars:
Skycity Triple Crown in Hidden Valley Raceway, Darwin, Northern Territory
Race 14: (1) Jamie Whincup  (Holden Commodore) (2) Mark Winterbottom  (Ford Falcon) (3) Shane van Gisbergen  (Ford Falcon)
Drivers' championship standings (after 14 of 26 races): (1) James Courtney  (Ford Falcon) 1698 points (2) Whincup 1641 (3) Craig Lowndes  (Holden Commodore) 1452
World Touring Car Championship:
Race of Belgium:
Round 7: (1) Gabriele Tarquini  (SR-Sport; SEAT León) (2) Yvan Muller  (Chevrolet; Chevrolet Cruze) (3) Alain Menu  (Chevrolet; Chevrolet Cruze)
Round 8: (1) Andy Priaulx  (BMW Team RBM; BMW 320si) (2) Rob Huff  (Chevrolet; Chevrolet Cruze) (3) Tiago Monteiro  (SR-Sport; SEAT León)
Drivers' championship standings (after 8 of 22 rounds): (1) Muller 128 points (2) Tarquini 109 (3) Priaulx 105
Manufacturers' championship standings: (1) Chevrolet 256 points (2) SEAT Customers Technology 239 (3) BMW 209

Cricket
South Africa in West Indies:
2nd Test in Basseterre, St Kitts, Day 3:
 543/6d (147 overs);  424/4 (116 overs; Shivnarine Chanderpaul 151*, Brendan Nash 114). West Indies trail by 119 runs with 6 wickets remaining in the 1st innings.

Cycling
UCI ProTour:
Tour de Suisse:
Stage 9:  Tony Martin  32' 21"  Fabian Cancellara   + 17"  David Zabriskie  + 29"
Final general classification: (1) Fränk Schleck   35h 02' 00" (2) Lance Armstrong  + 12" (3) Jakob Fuglsang   + 17"

Equestrianism
Show jumping:
FEI Nations Cup Promotional League:
FEI Nations Cup of Finland in Ypäjä (CSIO 3*):   (Joan Greene on Biscaya Déversem, Edward Little on Kalvinretto, Alexander Butler on Will Wimble, Tholm Keane on Warrenstown You 2)   (Philippe Le Jeune on Boyente de Muze, Evelyne Blaton on Haruba, Cindy van der Straten on Luxana-H, Gudrun Patteet on Carlino G)   (Karina Skou Truelsen on Lord if de Chalousse, Rikke Haastrup on Luganer, Torben Frandsen on Alcamo Vogt, Thomas Sandgaard on Rubber Ball)
Standings (after 8 of 11 competitions): (1)  49 points, (2)  47, (3)  25
Longines Grand Prix Port of Rotterdam in Rotterdam:  Rolf-Göran Bengtsson  on Casall  Pénélope Leprevost  on Mylord Carthago  Laura Kraut  on Cedric  Carsten-Otto Nagel  on Corradina
Eventing:
Luhmühlen Horse Trials (CCI 4*):  Sharon Hunt  on Tankers Town  Ingrid Klimke  on FRH Butts Abraxxas  Andreas Dibowski  on FRH Fantasia

Football (soccer)
FIFA World Cup in South Africa: (team in bold advances to the round of 16)
Group F:
 0–2 
 1–1 
Standings (after 2 matches): Paraguay 4 points, Italy, New Zealand 2, Slovakia 1.
Group G:  3–1 
Standings: Brazil 6 points (2 matches),  1 (1), Côte d'Ivoire 1 (2),  0 (1).
2011 FIFA Women's World Cup qualification (UEFA):
Group 1:  3–0 
Standings: France 21 points (7 matches),  18 (7),  9 (6),  7 (7),  3 (6), Croatia 1 (7)

Golf
Men's majors:
U.S. Open in Pebble Beach, California, United States:
(1) Graeme McDowell  284 (E) (2) Grégory Havret  285 (+1) (3) Ernie Els  286 (+2)
McDowell wins his first major, becoming the first golfer from Northern Ireland to win a major since Fred Daly won the 1947 Open Championship and the first European to win the U.S. Open since Tony Jacklin in 1970.
European Tour:
Saint-Omer Open in France:
Winner: Martin Wiegele  277 (−7)
Wiegele wins his first European Tour title.
LPGA Tour:
ShopRite LPGA Classic in Galloway, New Jersey:
Winner: Ai Miyazato  197 (−16)
Miyazato wins her fifth LPGA Tour title.

Motorcycle racing
Moto GP:
British motorcycle Grand Prix in Northamptonshire, United Kingdom:
MotoGP: (1) Jorge Lorenzo  (Yamaha) (2) Andrea Dovizioso  (Honda) (3) Ben Spies  (Yamaha)
Riders' championship standings (after 5 of 18 rounds): (1) Lorenzo 115 points (2) Dovizioso 78 (3) Dani Pedrosa  (Honda) 73
Manufacturers' championship standings: (1) Yamaha 120 points (2) Honda 97 (3) Ducati 65
Moto2: (1) Jules Cluzel  (Suter) (2) Thomas Lüthi  (Moriwaki) (3) Julián Simón  (Suter)
Riders' championship standings (after 5 of 17 rounds): (1) Toni Elías  (Moriwaki) 80 points (2) Shoya Tomizawa  (Suter) 65 (3) Lüthi 58
Manufacturers' championship standings: (1) Suter 100 points (2) Moriwaki 96 (3) Speed Up 56
125cc: (1) Marc Márquez  (Derbi) (2) Pol Espargaró  (Derbi) (3) Bradley Smith  (Aprilia)
Riders' championship standings (after 5 of 17 rounds): (1) Espargaró 99 points (2) Nicolás Terol  (Aprilia) 98 (3) Márquez 82
Manufacturers' championship standings: (1) Derbi 120 points (2) Aprilia 101 (3) Honda 7

Rugby union
IRB Nations Cup in Bucharest:
 16–21 
 33–13 
 22–27 
Final standings: Namibia 12 points, Romania, Italy A 9, Argentina Jaguars, Georgia 5, Scotland A 2.
Namibia win the Cup for the first time.

Volleyball
FIVB World League, Week 3:
Pool A:  0–3 
Standings (after 6 matches):  14 points, Bulgaria 13, Netherlands 9,  0.
Pool B:  3–2 
Standings (after 6 matches): Serbia 15 points, Italy 14,  4,  3.
Men's European League, Week 3:
Pool A:
 0–3 
 2–3 
Standings (after 6 matches): Romania 10 points, Great Britain, Spain 9, Slovakia 8.
Women's European League, Week 3:
Pool A:
 0–3 
 3–0 
Standings: Bulgaria, Serbia 8 points (4 matches), Romania 8 (6), Great Britain 6 (6).
Women's Pan-American Cup in Rosarito and Tijuana, Mexico:
Group A:
 0–3 
 2–3 
Standings: Cuba 6 points (3 matches), Argentina 4 (2), Dominican Republic 3 (2), Brazil 3 (3), Canada 2 (2).
Group B:
 0–3 
 3–0 
 1–3 
Standings (after 3 matches): United States 6 points, Peru, Trinidad and Tobago 5, Puerto Rico, Mexico 4, Costa Rica 3.

June 19, 2010 (Saturday)

Athletics
European Team Championships Super League in Bergen, Norway:
Standings after day 1: (1)  209 points (2)  188 (3)  160.5

Auto racing
Nationwide Series:
Bucyrus 200 presented by Menards in Elkhart Lake, Wisconsin:
(1)  Carl Edwards (Ford; Roush Fenway Racing) (2)  Ron Fellows (Chevrolet; JR Motorsports) (3)  Brendan Gaughan (Toyota; Rusty Wallace Racing)
Drivers' championship standings (after 15 of 35 races): (1)  Brad Keselowski (Dodge, Penske Racing) 2466 points (2) Edwards 2229 (3)  Justin Allgaier (Dodge, Penske Racing) 2051
V8 Supercars:
Skycity Triple Crown in Hidden Valley Raceway, Darwin, Northern Territory
Race 13: (1) Mark Winterbottom  (Ford Falcon) (2) Jamie Whincup  (Holden Commodore) (3) Shane van Gisbergen  (Ford Falcon)
Drivers' championship standings (after 13 of 26 races): (1) James Courtney  (Ford Falcon) 1578 points (2) Whincup 1491 (3) Craig Lowndes  (Holden Commodore) 1341

Basketball
 Serie A Finals (best-of-7 series):
Game 4: Armani Jeans Milano 69–93 Montepaschi Siena. Siena win series 4–0.
Siena win the championship for the fourth successive time, and fifth overall.

Cricket
South Africa in West Indies:
2nd Test in Basseterre, St Kitts, Day 2:
 543/6d (147 overs; AB de Villiers 135*, Jacques Kallis 110);  86/1 (23.2 overs). West Indies trail by 457 runs with 9 wickets remaining in the 1st innings.
Asia Cup in Dambulla, Sri Lanka:
Group stage: (teams in bold advance to final, teams in strike are eliminated)
 267 (49.3 overs);  271/7 (49.5 overs). India win by 3 wickets.
Standings (after 2 matches): , India 9 points, Pakistan,  0.
England in Scotland:
Only ODI in Edinburgh:
 211 (49.5 overs);  213/3 (33.4 overs). England win by 7 wickets.

Cycling
UCI ProTour:
Tour de Suisse:
Stage 8:  Rui Costa  4h 10' 32"  José Joaquín Rojas  + 15"  Maxime Monfort  + 19"
General classification: (1) Robert Gesink   34h 27' 47" (2) Rigoberto Urán  + 29" (3) Steve Morabito  + 36"

Equestrianism
Dressage:
Grand Prix Freestyle in Rotterdam (CDIO 5*):  Edward Gal  on Moorlands Totilas  Adelinde Cornelissen  on Jerich Parzival  Imke Schellekens-Bartels  on Hunter Douglas Sunrise

Football (soccer)
FIFA World Cup in South Africa: (team in bold advances to the round of 16, team in strike is eliminated)
Group D in Rustenburg:  1–1 
Standings (after 2 matches): Ghana 4 points,  3, Australia 1.
Group E:
In Durban:  1–0 
In Pretoria:  1–2 
Standings (after 2 matches): Netherlands 6 points, Japan 3, Denmark 3, Cameroon 0.
2011 FIFA Women's World Cup qualification (UEFA): (teams in strike are eliminated)
Group 1:
 1–0 
 2–0 
Standings:  18 points (6 matches), Iceland 18 (7), Estonia 9 (6), Serbia 7 (7), Northern Ireland 3 (6),  1 (6)
Group 2:
 2–2 
 0–2 
Standings: Netherlands 14 points (7 matches), Norway 13 (5), Belarus 10 (5), Slovakia 3 (5),  0 (6).
Group 3:
 0–5 
 7–0 
Standings: Denmark 16 points (6 matches), Scotland 15 (5), Greece 9 (6), Bulgaria 4 (6),  0 (7).
Group 4:
 0–0 
 0–5 
Standings: Poland 13 points (6 matches), Hungary 12 (7), Ukraine 10 (5),  7 (5), Bosnia and Herzegovina 0 (7).
Group 5:  2–2 
Standings: England 16 points (6 matches), Spain 16 (7),  6 (5),  0 (7).
Group 6:
 0–3 
 0–1 
Standings: Switzerland 15 points (6 matches), Russia 12 (5),  9 (6), Israel 6 (6), Kazakhstan 0 (5)
Group 7:
 4–1 
 6–0 
Standings: Italy 19 points (7 matches), Finland 16 (6), Portugal, Slovenia 6 (6),  0 (7).
Group 8:
 11–0 
 0–0 
Standings: Sweden 13 points (5 matches), Czech Republic 10 (6), Belgium 10 (8),  6 (6), Azerbaijan 4 (5).

Golf
Men's majors:
U.S. Open in Pebble Beach, California, United States
Leaderboard after third round (USA unless stated): (1) Dustin Johnson 207 (−6) (2) Graeme McDowell  210 (−3) (3) Tiger Woods 212 (−1)
The Amateur Championship in Gullane, East Lothian, Scotland:
Final: Jin Jeong  def. James Byrne  5 & 4.

Rugby union
IRB Pacific Nations Cup:
 41–38  in Apia
 23–31  in Apia
Standings (after 2 matches): Fiji 9 points, Japan, Samoa 4, Tonga 3.
Mid-year Tests:
Week 4:
 42–9  in Dunedin
 20–21  in Sydney
 29–13  in Witbank
 9–13  in Mar del Plata
Churchill Cup in the United States:
Finals in Harrison, New Jersey:
Bowl:  19–38 
Plate:  10–24 
Cup:  38–18 
The Saxons win the Cup for the fifth time.

Tennis
ATP World Tour:
UNICEF Open in 's-Hertogenbosch, Netherlands:
Final: Sergiy Stakhovsky  def. Janko Tipsarević  6–3, 6–0
Stakhovsky wins the third title of his career.
Aegon International in Eastbourne, United Kingdom:
Final: Michaël Llodra  def. Guillermo García-López  7–5, 6–2
Llodra wins the fifth title of his career.
WTA Tour:
UNICEF Open in 's-Hertogenbosch, Netherlands:
Final: Justine Henin  def. Andrea Petkovic  3–6, 6–3, 6–4
Henin wins the 43rd title of her career.
Aegon International in Eastbourne, United Kingdom:
Final: Ekaterina Makarova  def. Victoria Azarenka  7–6(5), 6–4
Makarova wins the first title of her career.

Volleyball
FIVB World League, Week 3:  (teams in bold advance to final round)
Pool A:
 0–3 
 3–0 
Standings: Brazil 14 points (6 matches), Bulgaria 10 (5), Netherlands 9 (5), South Korea 0 (6).
Pool B:  1–3 
Standings:  14 points (5 matches),  12 (5), France 4 (6), China 3 (6).
Pool C:
 3–1 
 3–1 
Standings (after 6 matches): Russia 17 points, United States 12, Finland 4, Egypt 3.
Pool D:
 1–3 
 0–3 
Standings (after 6 matches): Cuba 13 points, Germany 12, Poland 9, Argentina 2.
Men's European League, Week 3:
Pool A:
 2–3 
 3–1 
Standings (after 5 matches): Great Britain, Romania 8 points, Spain, Slovakia 7.
Pool B:
 1–3 
 3–0 
Standings (after 6 matches): Portugal 12 points, Turkey 9, Greece 8, Austria 7.
Women's European League, Week 3:
Pool A:
 0–3 
 3–0 
Standings: Romania 7 points (5 matches), Serbia, Bulgaria 6 (3), Great Britain 5 (5).
Pool B:
 0–3 
 3–1 
Standings (after 4 matches): Turkey 7 points, Israel, Spain 6, Greece 5.
Women's Pan-American Cup in Rosarito and Tijuana, Mexico:
Group A:
 1–3 
 3–1 
Standings: Cuba 4 points (2 matches), Argentina, Dominican Republic 2 (1), Canada, Brazil 2 (2).
Group B:
 3–0 
 0–3 
 3–0 
Standings (after 2 matches): United States, Trinidad and Tobago 4 points, Peru, Puerto Rico 3, Costa Rica, Mexico 2.

June 18, 2010 (Friday)

Cricket
South Africa in West Indies:
2nd Test in Basseterre, St Kitts, Day 1:
 296/3 (86 overs; Graeme Smith 132); .
Asia Cup in Dambulla, Sri Lanka:
Group stage:
 312/4 (50 overs);  186 (40.2 overs). Sri Lanka win by 126 runs.
Standings: Sri Lanka 9 points (2 matches),  5 (1),  0 (1), Bangladesh 0 (2).

Cycling
UCI ProTour:
Tour de Suisse:
Stage 7:  Marcus Burghardt  4h 52' 02"  Óscar Freire  + 1' 01"  Greg Van Avermaet  + 1' 01"
General classification: (1) Robert Gesink   30h 15' 59" (2) Rigoberto Urán  + 29" (3) Steve Morabito  + 36"

Equestrianism
Show jumping
Meydan FEI Nations Cup:
FEI Nations Cup of the Netherlands in Rotterdam (CSIO 5*):   (Lauren Hough on Quick Study, Candice King on Skara Glen's Davos, Nicole Shahinian Simpson on Tristan, Laura Kraut on Cedric)    (Peter Charles on Pom d'Ami, David McPherson on Chamberlain Z, Scott Brash on Intertoy Z, John Whitaker on Peppermill)    (Vincent Voorn on Alpapillon-Armanie, Eric van der Vleuten on Utascha SFN, Harrie Smolders on Walnut de Muze, Marc Houtzager on Tamino)
Standings (after 4 of 8 competitions): (1)  33.5 points (2)  25.5 (3)  22

Football (soccer)
FIFA World Cup in South Africa:
Group C:
In Johannesburg:  2–2 
In Cape Town:  0–0 
Standings (after 2 matches): Slovenia 4 points, United States, England 2, Algeria 1.
Group D in Port Elizabeth:  0–1 
Standings: Germany 3 points (2 matches),  3 (1), Serbia 3 (2),  0 (1).

Golf
Men's majors:
U.S. Open in Pebble Beach, California, United States
Leaderboard after second round (USA unless stated): (1) Graeme McDowell  139 (−3) (2) Ernie Els , Dustin Johnson, Ryo Ishikawa  and Phil Mickelson 141 (−1)

Rugby union
Mid-year Tests:
Week 4:
New Zealand Māori  31–28  Ireland XV

Volleyball
FIVB World League, Week 3:  (teams in bold advance to final round)
Pool A:  3–1 
Standings: Brazil 11 points (5 matches), Netherlands 9 (4), Bulgaria 7 (4), South Korea 0 (5).
Pool B:
 2–3 
 3–0 
Standings (after 5 matches): Serbia 14 points, Italy 12, France 4, China 0.
Pool C:
 3–0 
 3–1 
Standings (after 5 matches): Russia 14 points, United States 9, Finland 4, Egypt 3.
Pool D:
 0–3 
 3–2 
Standings (after 5 matches): Cuba 13 points, Germany 9, Poland 6, Argentina 2.
Men's European League, Week 3:
Pool B:
 0–3 
 0–3 
Standings (after 5 matches): Portugal 10 points, Turkey 8, Greece, Austria 6.
Women's European League, Week 3:
Pool B:
 3–2 
 3–2 
Standings (after 3 matches): Israel, Turkey 5 points, Spain, Greece 4.
Women's Pan-American Cup in Rosarito and Tijuana, Mexico:
Group A:
 2–3 
 3–1 
Group B:
 0–3 
 3–0 
 0–3

June 17, 2010 (Thursday)

Basketball
 NBA Finals (best-of-7 series):
Game 7: Los Angeles Lakers 83, Boston Celtics 79. Lakers win series 4–3.
The Lakers win the championship for the second straight time and 16th overall.
Kobe Bryant is named as the Finals MVP for the second straight time.
 Basketball Bundesliga Finals (best-of-5 series):
Game 5: Brose Baskets Bamberg 72–70 Deutsche Bank Skyliners. Bamberg win series 3–2.
Bamberg win the championship for the third time.
 Serie A Finals (best-of-7 series):
Game 3: Armani Jeans Milano 75–88 Montepaschi Siena. Siena lead series 3–0.

Cricket
Australia in Ireland:
Only ODI in Dublin:
 231/9 (50 overs);  192 (42 overs). Australia win by 39 runs.

Cycling
UCI ProTour:
Tour de Suisse:
Stage 6:  Robert Gesink  6h 20' 53"  Rigoberto Urán  + 42"  Joaquim Rodríguez  + 42"
General classification: (1) Gesink  25h 18' 57" (2) Urán + 29" (3) Steve Morabito  + 36"

Equestrianism
Dressage:
Nations Cup of the Netherlands in Rotterdam (CDIO 5*):   (Hans Peter Minderhoud on Nadine, Imke Schellekens-Bartels on Sunrise, Adelinde Cornelissen on Parzival, Edward Gal on Totilas)    (Hubertus Schmidt on Donnelly, Christoph Koschel on Donnperignon, Monica Theodorescu on Whisper, Matthias-Alexander Rath on Sterntaler-UNICEF)   (Ashley Holzer on Pop Art, Belinda Trussell on Anton, Bonny Bonnello on Pikardi, Shannon Dueck on Ayscha)

Football (soccer)
FIFA World Cup in South Africa:
Group A in Polokwane:  0–2 
Standings (after 2 matches): , Mexico 4 points, France,  1.
Group B:
In Johannesburg:  4–1 
Gonzalo Higuaín scores the first hat-trick of the tournament.
In Bloemfontein:  2–1 
Standings (after 2 matches): Argentina 6 points, Korea Republic, Greece 3, Nigeria 0.

Golf
Men's majors:
U.S. Open in Pebble Beach, California:
Leaderboard after first round: (1) Shaun Micheel , Paul Casey  and Brendon de Jonge  69 (−2)

Rugby union
IRB Junior World Championship
Semifinals:
 28–16 
 36–7

U.S. college sports
Conference realignment:
The University of Utah, currently a member of the Mountain West Conference, officially accepts an invitation to join the Pacific-10 Conference effective in 2011. The Utes are the second school that joins the Pac-10 this month after Colorado, and that increase the Pac-10 to 12 members, making it eligible for a Conference Championship Game. (AP via ESPN)

June 16, 2010 (Wednesday)

Cricket
Asia Cup in Dambulla, Sri Lanka:
Group stage:
 167 (34.5 overs);  168/4 (30.4 overs). India win by 6 wickets.
Standings (after 1 match): India 5 points,  4, Bangladesh 0.

Cycling
UCI ProTour:
Tour de Suisse:
Stage 5:  Marcus Burghardt  4h 21' 23"  Martijn Maaskant  + 2"  Daniel Oss  + 4"
General classification: (1) Tony Martin   18h 57' 47" (2) Fabian Cancellara   + 1" (3) Thomas Löfkvist  + 9"

Football (soccer)
FIFA World Cup in South Africa:
Group A in Pretoria:  0–3 
Standings: Uruguay 4 points (2 matches),  1 (1), South Africa 1 (2).
Group H:
In Nelspruit:  0–1 
In Durban:  0–1

June 15, 2010 (Tuesday)

Basketball
 NBA Finals (best-of-7 series):
Game 6: Los Angeles Lakers 89, Boston Celtics 67. Series tied 3–3.
 NBA news:
 Michigan State coach Tom Izzo turns down a reported five-year, $30 million contract offer from the Cleveland Cavaliers. (AP via ESPN)
 ACB Finals (best-of-5 series):
Game 3: Caja Laboral 79–78 (OT) Regal FC Barcelona. Caja Laboral win series 3–0.
Caja Laboral win the championship for the third time.
Tiago Splitter is named as MVP.
 Basketball Bundesliga Finals (best-of-5 series):
Game 4: Deutsche Bank Skyliners 69–56 Brose Baskets Bamberg. Series tied 2–2.
 Serie A Finals (best-of-7 series):
Game 2: Montepaschi Siena 81–59 Armani Jeans Milano. Siena lead series 2–0.

Cricket
Asia Cup in Dambulla, Sri Lanka:
Group stage:
 242/9 (50 overs);  226 (47 overs; Shahid Afridi 109). Sri Lanka win by 16 runs.
Scotland in Netherlands:
Only ODI in Hazelaarweg, Rotterdam:
 235/6 (50 overs);  236/4 (49.2 overs). Netherlands win by 6 wickets, win 1-match series 1–0.

Cycling
UCI ProTour:
Tour de Suisse:
Stage 4:  Alessandro Petacchi  4h 57' 33"  Matti Breschel   s.t.  Marco Marcato  s.t.
General classification: (1) Tony Martin   14h 35' 37" (2) Fabian Cancellara   + 1" (3) Thomas Löfkvist  + 9"

Football (soccer)
FIFA World Cup in South Africa:
Group F in Rustenburg:  1–1 
Group G:
In Port Elizabeth:  0–0 
In Johannesburg:  2–1

Rugby union
IRB Nations Cup in Bucharest:
 21–3 
 20–23 
 24–8 
Standings (after 2 matches): Italy A, Namibia 8 points, Romania 5, Georgia 4, Scotland A 2, Argentina Jaguars 1.

June 14, 2010 (Monday)

Cycling
UCI ProTour:
Tour de Suisse:
Stage 3:  Fränk Schleck  5h 02' 21"  Rigoberto Urán  s.t.  Bauke Mollema  + 3"
General classification: (1) Tony Martin   9h 38' 04" (2) Fabian Cancellara   + 1" (3) Thomas Löfkvist  + 9"

Football (soccer)
FIFA World Cup in South Africa:
Group E:
In Johannesburg:  2–0 
In Bloemfontein:  1–0 
Group F in Cape Town:  1–1

Golf
LPGA Tour:
State Farm Classic in Springfield, Illinois:
Winner: Cristie Kerr  266 (−22)
Kerr wins her thirteenth LPGA Tour title.

U.S. college sports
 Conference realignment:
 A last-minute deal leads the University of Texas to stay in a 10-team Big 12 Conference. Shortly after Texas' decision, Texas A&M, Texas Tech, Oklahoma, and Oklahoma State all decide to stay put in the Big 12. (ESPN)

June 13, 2010 (Sunday)

Auto racing
Formula One:
Canadian Grand Prix in Montreal, Canada:
(1) Lewis Hamilton  (McLaren–Mercedes) (2) Jenson Button  (McLaren-Mercedes) (3) Fernando Alonso  (Ferrari)
Drivers' championship standings (after 8 of 19 races): (1) Hamilton 109 points (2) Button 106 (3) Mark Webber  (Red Bull–Renault) 103
Constructors' championship standings: (1) McLaren 215 points (2) Red Bull 193 (3) Ferrari 161
NASCAR Sprint Cup Series:
Heluva Good! Sour Cream Dips 400 in Brooklyn, Michigan:
(1)  Denny Hamlin (Toyota; Joe Gibbs Racing) (2)  Kasey Kahne (Ford; Richard Petty Motorsports) (3)  Kurt Busch (Dodge; Penske Racing)
Drivers' championship standings (after 15 of 36 races): (1)  Kevin Harvick (Chevrolet; Richard Childress Racing) 2169 points (2)  Kyle Busch (Toyota; Joe Gibbs Racing) 2147 (3) Hamlin 2122
24 Hours of Le Mans in Le Mans, France:
(1)  #9 Audi Sport North America (Timo Bernhard , Romain Dumas , Mike Rockenfeller ) (2)  #8 Audi Sport Team Joest (Marcel Fässler , André Lotterer , Benoît Tréluyer ) (3)  #7 Audi Sport Team Joest (Rinaldo Capello , Tom Kristensen , Allan McNish )

Basketball
 NBA Finals (best-of-7 series):
Game 5: Boston Celtics 92, Los Angeles Lakers 86. Celtics lead series 3–2.
 Basketball Bundesliga Finals (best-of-5 series):
Game 3: Brose Baskets Bamberg 97–52 Deutsche Bank Skyliners. Bamberg lead series 2–1.
 Serie A Finals (best-of-7 series):
Game 1: Montepaschi Siena 100–80 Armani Jeans Milano. Siena lead series 1–0.
 Ligue Nationale de Basketball Final in Paris:
Cholet 81–65 Le Mans
Cholet win the championship for the first time.

Cricket
South Africa in West Indies:
1st Test in Kingston, Jamaica, Day 4:
 352 and 206/4d (62 overs);  102 (47.1 overs) and 293 (80.3 overs). South Africa win by 163 runs; lead 3-match series 1–0.
India in Zimbabwe:
2nd T20I in Harare:
 140/5 (20 overs);  144/3 (18 overs). India win by 7 wickets; win 2-match series 2–0.
ICC Intercontinental Cup, Day 4:
 210 (90 overs) and 257 (96.2 overs; Peter Borren 109);  391 (133.2 overs) and 77/6 (24.2 overs) in Deventer. Scotland win by 4 wickets.
Standings: Scotland 69 points (4 matches),  57 (4),  43 (5),  23 (2), Netherlands 15 (4),  12 (3),  9 (4).

Cycling
UCI ProTour:
Critérium du Dauphiné:
Stage 7:  Edvald Boasson Hagen  3h 39' 43"  Arkaitz Durán  + 27"  Egor Silin  + 32"
Final general classification: (1) Janez Brajkovič   28h 06' 28" (2) Alberto Contador   + 1' 41" (3) Tejay van Garderen  + 2' 41"
Tour de Suisse:
Stage 2:  Heinrich Haussler  4h 25' 16"  Pablo Urtasun  s.t.  Marco Marcato  s.t.
General classification: (1) Fabian Cancellara   4h 35' 37" (2) Roman Kreuziger   + 1" (3) Tony Martin  + 3"

Football (soccer)
FIFA World Cup in South Africa:
Group C in Polokwane:  0–1 
Standings (after 1 match): Slovenia 3 points,  1, Algeria 0.
Group D:
In Pretoria:  0–1 
In Durban:  4–0

Golf
PGA Tour:
St. Jude Classic in Memphis, Tennessee:
Winner: Lee Westwood  270 (−10)PO
Westwood wins his second PGA Tour title.
European Tour:
Estoril Open de Portugal in Estoril, Portugal:
Winner: Thomas Bjørn  265 (−23)
Bjørn wins his tenth European Tour title.
LPGA Tour:
State Farm Classic in Springfield, Illinois: Play suspended due to storm threat; final round will resume June 14.
Curtis Cup in Manchester-by-the-Sea, Massachusetts:
 Team USA  12½–7½   Team Great Britain & Ireland
 Team USA retains the trophy, extending its streak of wins in this competition to seven.

Rugby union
IRB Junior World Championship in Argentina: (teams in bold advance to semi-finals)
Pool A:
 43–10 
 12–15 
Final standings: New Zealand 15 points, Wales 8, Fiji 4, Samoa 1.
Pool B:
 17–9 
 21–24 
Final standings: England 13 points, France 9, Argentina 4, Ireland 2.
Pool C:
 27–3 
 35–42 
Final standings: Australia 15 points, South Africa 12, Scotland 4, Tonga 0.
Churchill Cup in the United States:
Pool matches in Glendale, Colorado: (teams in bold advance to cup final, teams in italic advance to plate final, teams in strike advance to bowl final)
Pool A:  27–33 
Final standings: Canada 9 points, France A 6,  0.
Pool B:  32–9 
Final standings: England Saxons 10 points, United States 5,  0.

Tennis
ATP World Tour:
Gerry Weber Open in Halle, Germany
Final: Lleyton Hewitt  def. Roger Federer  3–6, 7–6(4), 6–4
Hewitt wins his 28th career title.
Aegon Championships in London, United Kingdom
Final: Sam Querrey  def. Mardy Fish  7–6(3), 7–5
Querrey wins his fifth career title.
WTA Tour:
Aegon Classic in Birmingham, United Kingdom
Final: Li Na  def. Maria Sharapova  7–5, 6–1
Li wins her third career title.

Volleyball
FIVB World League, Week 2:
Pool A:
 0–3 
 3–1 
Standings (after 4 matches): Netherlands 9 points, Brazil 8, Bulgaria 7, South Korea 0.
Pool B:  3–0 
Standings (after 4 matches):  12 points, Italy 11,  1, China 0.
Men's European League, Week 2:
Pool B:
 3–2 
 3–1 
Standings (after 4 matches): Portugal 8 points, Turkey 6, Greece, Austria 5.
Montreux Volley Masters:
3rd place match:  0–3  
Final match:   3–1  
China win the tournament for the fifth time.
Asian Men's Club Championship:
3rd place: Shanghai Oriental  0–3   Panasonic Panthers
Final:  Al-Arabi  1–3   Paykan Tehran
Paykan win the title for the fifth consecutive time and sixth overall.

June 12, 2010 (Saturday)

Athletics
IAAF Diamond League:
Adidas Grand Prix in New York City, United States:
Men:
100 metres: Richard Thompson  9.89
800 metres: Mbulaeni Mulaudzi  1:44.38
1500 metres: Nicholas Kemboi  3:33.29
400 metres hurdles: Kerron Clement  47.86
3000 metres steeplechase: Paul Kipsiele Koech  8:10.43
Triple jump: Teddy Tamgho  17.98 m
High jump: Linus Thörnblad  2.30 m
Pole vault: Renaud Lavillenie  5.70 m
Javelin throw: Andreas Thorkildsen  87.02 m
Women:
200 metres: Veronica Campbell-Brown  21.98
800 metres: Laura Januszewski  2:03.39
1500 metres: Nancy Langat  4:01.60
5000 metres: Tirunesh Dibaba  15:11.34
100 metres hurdles: Lolo Jones  12.55
Long jump: Brianna Glenn  6.78 m
Pole vault: Jillian Schwartz  4.60 m
Shot put: Valerie Vili  19.93 m
Discus throw: Sandra Perković  61.96 m

Auto racing
Nationwide Series:
Meijer 300 in Sparta, Kentucky: (1)  Joey Logano (Toyota, Joe Gibbs Racing) (2)  Carl Edwards (Ford, Roush Fenway Racing) (3)  Brad Keselowski (Dodge, Penske Racing)
Logano completes a hat-trick, as he wins his third consecutive race in Kentucky, all from the pole — the first time that any Nationwide Series driver has done so at any single track.
Drivers' championship standings (after 14 of 35 races): (1) Keselowski 2306 points (2) Edwards 2034 (3)  Justin Allgaier (Dodge, Penske Racing) 1993

Basketball
 ACB Finals (best-of-5 series):
Game 2: Regal FC Barcelona 69–70 Caja Laboral. Caja Laboral lead series 2–0.

Boxing
European Men's Championships in Moscow, Russia:
Light flyweight:  Paddy Barnes   Elvin Mamishzade   Hovhannes Danielyan   José Kelvin de la Nieve Linares 
Flyweight:  Misha Aloyan   Khalid Saeed Yafai   Vincenzo Picardi   Ronny Beblik 
Bantamweight:  Eduard Abzalimov   Georgiy Chygayev   Andrew Selby   Gamal Yafai 
Featherweight:  Denis Makarov   Iain Weaver   Sergey Kunitsyn   Tyrone McCullough 
Lightweight:  Albert Selimov   Thomas Stalker   Eugen Burhard   Eric Donovan 
Light welterweight:  Hrachik Javakhyan   Gyula Káté   Alexander Solyannikov   Oleksandr Klyuchko 
Welterweight:  Balazs Bacskai   Alexis Vastine   Magomed Nurutdinov   Taras Shelestyuk 
Middleweight:  Artem Chebotarev   Darren O'Neill   Nikolay Veselov   Mladen Manev 
Light heavyweight:  Artur Beterbiyev   Abdelkader Bouhenia   Artur Khachatryan   Kenneth Egan 
Heavyweight:  Egor Mekhontsev   Tervel Pulev   Denis Poyatsika   Jozsef Darmos 
Super heavyweight:  Sergey Kuzmin   Viktar Zuyev   Yousef Abdelghani   Roman Kapitonenko

Cricket
South Africa in West Indies:
1st Test in Kingston, Jamaica, Day 3:
 352 & 155/2 (43.3 overs);  102 (47.1 overs). South Africa lead by 405 runs with 8 wickets remaining.
India in Zimbabwe:
1st T20I in Harare:
 111/9 (20 overs);  112/4 (15 overs). India win by 6 wickets; lead 2-match series 1–0.
ICC Intercontinental Cup, Day 3:
 210 (90 overs) and 168/8 (69 overs);  391 (133.2 overs) in Deventer. Netherlands trail by 13 runs with 2 wickets remaining.

Cycling
UCI ProTour:
Critérium du Dauphiné:
Stage 6:  Alberto Contador   4h 31' 01"  Janez Brajkovič   s.t.  Sylwester Szmyd  + 17"
General classification: (1) Brajkovič  24h 26' 05" (2) Contador + 1' 41" (3) Tejay van Garderen  + 2' 41"
Tour de Suisse:
Stage 1:  Fabian Cancellara  10' 21"  Roman Kreuziger  + 1"  Tony Martin  + 3"

Equestrianism
Show jumping:
Global Champions Tour:
4th Competition in Cannes:  Edwina Alexander  on Itot du Chateau  Kevin Staut  on Le Prestige St Lois  Jessica Kürten  on Libertina
Standings (after 4 of 9 competitions): (1) Marco Kutscher  138 points (2) Marcus Ehning  122 (3) Kürten 100
FEI Nations Cup of Poland in Sopot:   (Franz-Josef Dahlmann on Lifou, Sarah Nagel-Tornau on Udarco, Andre Thieme on Aragon Rouet, Felix Hassmann on Lianos)   (Lucia Vizzini on Quinta Roo, Emanuele Gaudiano on Chicago, Davide Kainich on Loro Piana JHG, Massimo Grossato on Lady Luna)   (Sándor Szász on Moosbachhofs Goldwing, Balázs Horváth on Santiago, Mariann Hugyecz on Cash, James Wingrave on Sissi)
Standings (after 7 of 11 competitions): (1)  47 points (2) Italy 47 (3)  25

Football (soccer)
FIFA World Cup in South Africa:
Group B:
In Port Elizabeth:  2–0 
In Johannesburg:  1–0 
Group C in Rustenburg:  1–1

Mixed martial arts
UFC 115 in Vancouver:
Welterweight bout: Carlos Condit  def. Rory MacDonald  by TKO (strikes)
Heavyweight bout: Ben Rothwell  def. Gilbert Yvel  by unanimous decision (30–27, 29–28, 29–28)
Welterweight bout: Martin Kampmann  def. Paulo Thiago  by unanimous decision (30–27, 30–27, 30–27)
Heavyweight bout: Mirko Filipović  def. Patrick Barry  by submission (rear naked choke)
Light Heavyweight bout: Rich Franklin  def. Chuck Liddell  by KO (punch)

Rugby union
IRB Pacific Nations Cup:
 24–23  in Apia
 22–8  in Lautoka
Mid-year Tests:
Week 3:
 66–28  in New Plymouth
 27–17  in Perth
 42–17  in Cape Town
 16–24  in Tucumán

Volleyball
FIVB World League, Week 2: (teams in bold advance to final round)
Pool A:
 0–3 
 0–3 
Standings (after 3 matches): Netherlands 9 points, Brazil 5, Bulgaria 4, South Korea 0.
Pool B:  0–3 
Standings: Serbia 12 points (4 matches), Italy 8 (3), France 1 (4), China 0 (3).
Pool C:
 3–2 
 1–3 
Standings (after 4 matches): Russia 11 points, United States 6, Finland 4, Egypt 3.
Pool D:
 2–3 
 3–1 
Standings (after 4 matches): Cuba 11 points, Germany 6, Poland 5, Argentina 2.
Men's European League, Week 2:
Pool A:
 0–3 
 2–3 
Standings (after 4 matches): Romania 7 points, Great Britain, Slovakia 6, Spain 5.
Pool B:
 3–2 
 3–0 
Standings (after 3 matches): Portugal 6 points, Greece, Turkey, Austria 4.
Women's European League, Week 2:
Pool A:
 3–0 
 0–3 
Standings: Romania 6 points (4 matches), Serbia, Bulgaria 4 (2), Great Britain 4 (4).
Pool B:
 3–0 
 2–3 
Standings (after 2 matches): Israel, Turkey 4 points, Spain, Greece 2.
Montreux Volley Masters:
Semi-finals:
 1–3 
 0–3 
Asian Men's Club Championship:
Semifinals:
Shanghai Oriental  1–3  Al-Arabi
Paykan Tehran  3–0  Panasonic Panthers

June 11, 2010 (Friday)

Cricket
South Africa in West Indies:
1st Test in Kingston, Jamaica, Day 2:
 352 (129.4 overs); .
ICC Intercontinental Cup, Day 2:
 210 (90 overs);  273/7 (103 overs) in Deventer. Scotland lead by 63 runs with 3 wickets remaining in the 1st innings.

Cycling
UCI ProTour:
Critérium du Dauphiné:
Stage 5:  Daniel Navarro  3h 26' 16"  Eros Capecchi  + 34"  Thibaut Pinot  + 34"
General classification: (1) Janez Brajkovič   19h 55' 04" (2) Tejay van Garderen  + 1' 15" (3) Alberto Contador   + 1' 41"

Equestrianism
Show jumping:
FEI Nations Cup of Turkey in Istanbul:   (Stephan Lafouge on Visage Van De Olmenhoeve, Caroline Nicolas on Nobylis, Yoann Le Vot on Modena, Jean Marc Nicolas on Oxford D'Esquelmes)   (Nick Motmans on Aladdin St Ghyvan, Candice Lauwers on Cibolin Prieure Z, Jody Bosteels on Nina Droeshout, Jan Motmans on Vacant ter Linden)   (Luca Marziani on Cascartho -O.H., Giovanni Oberti on Caribo Z, Andrea Messersi on Vacant ter Linden, Paolo Zudavelli on Youri du Moulin)
Standings (after 6 of 11 competitions): (1)  40 points (2)  37 (3)  25

Football (soccer)
FIFA World Cup in South Africa:
Group A:
In Johannesburg:  1–1 
In Cape Town:  0–0

Rugby union
IRB Nations Cup in Bucharest:
 21–17 
 20–22 
 21–22

U.S. college sports
 Conference realignment:
 The Mountain West Conference announces that Boise State University will leave the Western Athletic Conference to become the MWC's 10th member. (ESPN)
 The Big Ten Conference has accepted the application of the University of Nebraska to join the league. Nebraska's move may lead to the demise of the Cornhuskers' current conference, the Big 12, which lost the University of Colorado to the Pac-10 yesterday. (ESPN)

Volleyball
FIVB World League, Week 2:  (teams in bold advance to final round)
Pool B:  3–0 
Standings (after 3 matches):  9 points, Italy 8,  1, China 0.
Pool C:
 3–1 
 1–3 
Standings (after 3 matches): Russia 9 points, Finland 4, USA 3, Egypt 2.
Pool D:
 1–3 
 3–0 
Standings (after 3 matches): Cuba 8 points, Germany 6, Poland 3, Argentina 1.
Men's European League, Week 2:
Pool A:
 3–1 
 3–0 
Standings (after 3 matches): Romania 6 points, Spain, Great Britain, Slovakia 4.
Women's European League, Week 2:
Pool A:
 3–0 
 0–3 
Standings: Romania 5 points (3 matches), Great Britain 3 (3), Serbia, Bulgaria 2 (1).
Pool B:
 3–1 
 2–3 
Montreux Volley Masters: (teams in bold advance to the semifinals)
Group A:
 1–3 
 1–3 
Final standings: Russia 6 points, United States 5, Japan 4, Germany 3.
Group B:  3–0 
Final standings: Cuba 6 points,  5,  4, Poland 3.
Asian Men's Club Championship:
Quarterfinals:
Panasonic Panthers  3–1  Federbrau
Al-Arabi  3–1  Almaty
Shanghai Oriental  3–1  Asia World
Paykan Tehran  3–0  Sports Center 1

June 10, 2010 (Thursday)

Athletics
IAAF Diamond League:
Golden Gala in Rome, Italy:
Men:
100 metres: Asafa Powell  9.82
200 metres: Walter Dix  19.86
400 metres: Jeremy Wariner  44.73
1500 metres: Augustine Kiprono Choge  3:32.21
5000 metres: Imane Merga  13:00.12
110 metres hurdles: Dayron Robles  13.14
4x100 metres relay:  38.50
Long jump: Dwight Phillips  8.42 m
Shot put: Christian Cantwell  21.67 m
Discus throw: Piotr Małachowski  68.78 m
Women:
100 metres: LaShauntea Moore  11.04
800 metres: Halima Hachlaf  1:58.40
400 metres hurdles: Lashinda Demus  52.82
3000 metres steeplechase: Milcah Chemos Cheywa  9:11.71
Triple jump: Yargelis Savigne  14.74 m
High jump: Blanka Vlašić  2.03 m
Pole vault: Fabiana Murer  4.70 m
Javelin throw: Barbora Špotáková  68.66 m

Basketball
 NBA Finals (best-of-7 series):
Game 4: Boston Celtics 96, Los Angeles Lakers 89. Series tied 2–2.
 ACB Finals (best-of-5 series):
Game 1: Regal FC Barcelona 58–63 Caja Laboral. Caja Laboral lead series 1–0.

Cricket
South Africa in West Indies:
1st Test in Kingston, Jamaica, Day 1:
 70/3 (34 overs); 
ICC Intercontinental Cup, Day 1:
 210 (90 overs);  16/1 (6 overs) in Deventer. Scotland trail by 194 runs with 9 wickets remaining in the 1st innings.

Cycling
UCI ProTour:
Critérium du Dauphiné:
Stage 4:  Nicolas Vogondy  6h 03' 25"  Romain Sicard  + 12"  Janez Brajkovič   + 15"
General classification: (1) Brajkovič  16h 25' 44" (2) Tejay van Garderen  + 1' 15" (3) Alberto Contador  + 1' 41"

U.S. college sports
 News:
 The Pacific-10 Conference officially announces that the University of Colorado, currently a member of the Big 12 Conference, has formally accepted an invitation to join that conference. (ESPN)
 The NCAA announces major penalties against the University of Southern California's football program following revelations of improper benefits to 2005 Heisman Trophy winner Reggie Bush. The Trojans are banned from postseason play for two years, lose 10 scholarships in each of the next three seasons, and must vacate 14 wins from December 2004 through 2005, including their win in the BCS National Championship Game following the 2004 season. (ESPN)

Volleyball
FIVB World League, Week 2:
Pool B:  0–3 
Standings: Serbia 9 points (3 matches),  5 (2), France 1 (3),  0 (2).
Montreux Volley Masters: (teams in bold advance to the semifinals)
Group A:  3–0 
Standings (after 2 matches): Russia,  4 points, Germany,  2.
Group B:
 1–3 
 2–3 
Standings: China 5 points (3 matches), Cuba 4 (2), Netherlands 4 (3), Poland 2 (2).

June 9, 2010 (Wednesday)

Basketball
 Premier A Slovenian Basketball League Finals (best-of-5 series):
Game 5: Union Olimpija 79–87 Krka.  Krka win series 3–2.
Krka win the championship for the third time.
 Basketball Bundesliga Finals (best-of-5 series):
Game 2: Deutsche Bank Skyliners 68–77 Brose Baskets Bamberg. Series tied 1–1.

Cricket
Tri-nation series in Zimbabwe:
Final in Harare:
 199 (49 overs);  203/1 (34.4 overs; Tillakaratne Dilshan 108*). Sri Lanka win by 9 wickets.

Cycling
UCI ProTour:
Critérium du Dauphiné:
Stage 3:  Janez Brajkovič  1h 01' 51"  David Millar  + 27"  Edvald Boasson Hagen  + 44"
General classification: (1) Brajkovič  10h 22' 04" (2) Millar + 36" (3) Tejay van Garderen   + 50"

Football (soccer)
2011 FIFA Women's World Cup qualification (UEFA): (teams in strike are eliminated)
Group 5:  6–0 
Standings:  15 points (5 matches),  15 (6), Austria,  6 (5), Malta 0 (7).

Ice hockey
Stanley Cup Finals (best-of-7 series):
Game 6: Chicago Blackhawks 4, Philadelphia Flyers 3 (OT). Blackhawks win series 4–2.
The Blackhawks win the Cup for the fourth time and the first time since 1961.
Blackhawks captain Jonathan Toews is awarded the Conn Smythe Trophy as the MVP of the playoffs.
The Blackhawks' victory also makes Toews the newest member of the Triple Gold Club, consisting of individuals who have won the Stanley Cup, a World Championship gold medal, and Olympic gold medal.

Rugby union
IRB Junior World Championship in Argentina:
Pool A:
 31–3 
 77–7 
Standings (after 2 matches): New Zealand 10 points, Wales 8, Fiji, Samoa 0.
Pool B:
 36–21 
 23–31 
Standings (after 2 matches): England, France 9 points, Ireland 1, Argentina 0.
Pool C:
 67–5 
 73–0 
Standings (after 2 matches): Australia, South Africa 10 points, Tonga, Scotland 0.
Churchill Cup in the United States:
Pool matches in Glendale, Colorado: (teams in strike advance to bowl final)
Pool A:  10–43 
Standings: , France A 5 points (1 match), Uruguay 0 (2).
Pool B:  17–49 
Standings: England Saxons,  5 points (1 match), Russia 0 (2).

Volleyball
Montreux Volley Masters:
Group A:
 3–1 
 3–0 
Standings: United States 4 points (2 matches), Russia 2 (1), Japan 2 (2), Germany 1 (1).
Group B:  0–3 
Standings: China 4 points (2 matches),  2 (1), Netherlands 2 (2),  1 (1).

June 8, 2010 (Tuesday)

Basketball
 NBA Finals (best-of-7 series):
Game 3: Los Angeles Lakers 91, Boston Celtics 84. Lakers lead series 2–1.

Cycling
UCI ProTour:
Critérium du Dauphiné:
Stage 2:  Juan José Haedo  4h 24' 10"  Martin Reimer  s.t.  Grega Bole  s.t.
General classification: (1) Alberto Contador   9h 20' 08" (2) Tejay van Garderen  + 2" (3) Janez Brajkovič  + 5"

Football (soccer)
2011 European Under-21 Championship qualification: (teams in strike are eliminated)
Group 6:  2–0 
Standings: Sweden 16 points (6 matches), Montenegro 13 (7),  10 (6),  5 (8),  4 (7).

Volleyball
Montreux Volley Masters:
Group A:  0–3 
Group B:
 3–1 
 3–0

June 7, 2010 (Monday)

Baseball
MLB Draft:
Bryce Harper, a 17-year-old catcher and outfielder at the College of Southern Nevada, is selected as the first overall pick by the Washington Nationals.

Basketball
 Russian Super League Final (best-of-5 series):
Game 3: Khimki Moscow Region 60–76 CSKA Moscow. CSKA Moscow win series 3–0.
CSKA Moscow win the championship for the eighth consecutive time and 17th time overall.

Cricket
Tri-nation series in Zimbabwe:
Group stage: (teams in bold advance to the final)
 236 (47.5 overs);  240/2 (47.5 overs; Brendan Taylor 119*) in Harare. Zimbabwe win by 8 wickets.
Final standings: Zimbabwe 13 points, Sri Lanka 9,  4.

Cycling
UCI ProTour:
Critérium du Dauphiné:
Stage 1:  Grega Bole  4h 47' 24"  Peter Velits   s.t.  Geraint Thomas  s.t.
General classification: (1) Alberto Contador   4h 55' 58" (2) Tejay van Garderen  + 2" (3) Janez Brajkovič  + 5"

Football (soccer)
 Egypt Cup Final in Cairo:
Haras El Hodood 1–1 (5–4 pen.) Al-Ahly
Haras El Hodood win the Cup for the second successive season.

June 6, 2010 (Sunday)

Auto racing
NASCAR Sprint Cup Series:
Gillette Fusion ProGlide 500 in Long Pond, Pennsylvania:
(1)  Denny Hamlin (Toyota, Joe Gibbs Racing) (2)  Kyle Busch (Toyota, Joe Gibbs Racing) (3)  Tony Stewart (Chevrolet, Stewart Haas Racing)
Drivers' championship standings (after 14 of 36 races): (1)  Kevin Harvick (Chevrolet, Richard Childress Racing) 2063 points (2) Busch 2044 (3) Hamlin 1927

Basketball
 NBA Finals (best-of-7 series):
Game 2: Boston Celtics 103, Los Angeles Lakers 94. Series tied 1–1.
 A1 Ethniki Final (best-of-5 series):
Game 4: Olympiacos 69–76 Panathinaikos. Game abandoned due to fan riots, Greek Federation awarded technical win to Panathinaikos. Panathinaikos win series 3–1.
Panathinaikos win the championship for the eighth consecutive time and 31st time overall.
 Novo Basquete Brasil Finals (best-of-5 series):
Game 5: Universo/BRB 76–74 Flamengo. Universo win series 3–2.
Universo win the championship for the first time.
 Premier A Slovenian Basketball League Finals (best-of-5 series):
Game 4: Krka 63–67 Union Olimpija. Series tied 2–2.
 Basketball Bundesliga Finals (best-of-5 series):
Game 1: Brose Baskets Bamberg 63–65 Deutsche Bank Skyliners. Skyliners lead series 1–0.

Cricket
Bangladesh in England:
2nd Test in Manchester, day 3:
 419;  216 and 123 (f/o; 34.1 overs). England win by an innings and 80 runs; win 2-match series 2–0.

Cycling
UCI ProTour:
Critérium du Dauphiné:
Prologue:  Alberto Contador  8' 34"  Tejay van Garderen  + 2"  Janez Brajkovič  + 5"

Golf
PGA Tour:
Memorial Tournament in Dublin, Ohio:
Winner: Justin Rose  270 (−18)
Rose wins his first PGA Tour title.
European Tour:
Celtic Manor Wales Open in Newport, Wales:
Winner: Graeme McDowell  269 (−15)
McDowell wins his fifth European Tour title.
Champions Tour:
Principal Charity Classic in West Des Moines, Iowa:
Winner: Nick Price  199 (−14)
Price wins his third Champions Tour title.

Ice hockey
Stanley Cup Finals (best-of-7 series):
Game 5: Chicago Blackhawks 7, Philadelphia Flyers 4. Blackhawks lead series 3–2.

Motorcycle racing
Moto GP:
Italian motorcycle Grand Prix in Mugello, Italy:
MotoGP: (1) Dani Pedrosa  (Honda) (2) Jorge Lorenzo  (Yamaha) (3) Andrea Dovizioso  (Honda)
Riders' championship standings (after 4 of 18 rounds): (1) Lorenzo 90 points (2) Pedrosa 65 (3) Valentino Rossi  (Yamaha) 61
Manufacturers' championship standings: (1) Yamaha 95 points (2) Honda 77 (3) Ducati 52
Moto2: (1) Andrea Iannone  (Speed Up) (2) Sergio Gadea  (Pons Kalex) (3) Simone Corsi  (MotoBi)
Riders' championship standings (after 4 of 17 rounds): (1) Toni Elías  (Moriwaki) 74 points (2) Shoya Tomizawa  (Suter) 55 (3) Corsi 51
Manufacturers' championship standings: (1) Moriwaki 76 points (2) Suter 75 (3) MotoBi 53
125cc: (1) Marc Márquez  (Derbi) (2) Nicolás Terol  (Aprilia) (3) Pol Espargaró  (Aprilia)
Riders' championship standings (after 4 of 17 rounds): (1) Terol 85 points (2) Espargaró 79 (3) Márquez 57
Manufacturers' championship standings: (1) Derbi 95 points (2) Aprilia 85 (3) Honda 7

Snooker
Wuxi Classic in Wuxi, China:
Final: Shaun Murphy  def. Ding Junhui  9–8

Tennis
Grand Slams:
French Open in Paris, France:
Men's singles final:
Rafael Nadal  [2] def. Robin Söderling  [5] 6–4, 6–2, 6–4
Nadal wins the title for the fifth time in six years.
Boys' singles final:
Agustín Velotti  def. Andrea Collarini  6–4, 7–5
Girls' singles final:
Elina Svitolina  def. Ons Jabeur  6–2, 7–5
Legends under 45 doubles final:
Yevgeny Kafelnikov  / Andriy Medvedev  def. Goran Ivanišević  / Michael Stich  6–1, 6–1
Legends over 45 doubles final:
Andrés Gómez  / John McEnroe  def. Mansour Bahrami  / Henri Leconte  6–1, 6–1

Triathlon
ITU World Championships in Madrid, Spain:
Men:  Alistair Brownlee   Courtney Atkinson   Sven Riederer 
Standings (after 3 of 7 events): (1) Alexander Brukhankov  1723 points (2) Dmitry Polyanski  1639 (3) Atkinson 1480
Women:  Nicola Spirig   Emmie Charayron   Helen Jenkins 
Standings (after 3 of 7 events): (1) Barbara Riveros Diaz  2082 points (2) Mariko Adachi  1767 (3) Daniela Ryf  1543

Volleyball
FIVB World League, Week 1:  (teams in bold advance to final round)
Pool A:  0–3 
Standings (after 2 matches): Netherlands 6 points,  5,  1, South Korea 0.
Pool B:  3–1 
Standings (after 2 matches): Serbia 6 points,  5,  1, China 0.
Pool C:  3–1 
Standings (after 2 matches):  6 points, Finland 4, Egypt 2,  0.
Pool D:  3–0 
Standings (after 2 matches): Germany 6 points,  5,  1, Poland 0.
Men's European League, Week 1:
Pool A:  3–0 
Standings (after 2 matches): Romania 4 points, Great Britain, Slovakia 3, Spain 2.
Pool B:  0–3 
Standings (after 2 matches): Portugal 4 points, Greece, Austria 3, Turkey 2.
Women's European League, Week 1:
Pool A:  0–3 
Standings: Romania 4 points (2 matches), Great Britain 2 (2), Serbia, Bulgaria 0 (0).

June 5, 2010 (Saturday)

Auto racing
Nationwide Series:
Federated Auto Parts 300 in Gladeville, Tennessee:
(1)  Brad Keselowski (Dodge; Penske Racing) (2)  Carl Edwards (Ford; Roush Fenway Racing) (3)  Paul Menard (Ford; Roush Fenway Racing)
Drivers' championship standings (after 13 of 35 races): (1) Keselowski 2141 points (2)  Kyle Busch (Toyota; Joe Gibbs Racing) 1945 (3) Edwards 1864
IndyCar Series:
Firestone 550 in Fort Worth, Texas:
(1) Ryan Briscoe  (Team Penske) (2) Danica Patrick  (Andretti Autosport) (3) Marco Andretti  (Andretti Autosport)
Drivers' championship standings (after 7 of 17 races): (1) Dario Franchitti  (Chip Ganassi Racing) 246 points (2) Will Power  (Team Penske) 243 (3) Scott Dixon  (Chip Ganassi Racing) 235

Basketball
 National Basketball League Final (best-of-7 series):
Game 5: Nymburk 75–67 Prostějov. Nymburk win series 4–1.
Nymburk win the championship for the seventh straight time.

Cricket
Bangladesh in England:
2nd Test in Manchester, day 2:
 419 (121.3 overs; Ian Bell 128);  216 (54.1 overs; Tamim Iqbal 108). Bangladesh trail by 203 runs.
Tri-nation series in Zimbabwe:
Group stage: (teams in bold advance to the final)
 268/9 (50 overs);  270/4 (48.2 overs; Dinesh Chandimal 111) in Harare. Sri Lanka win by 6 wickets.
Standings: Sri Lanka,  9 points (3 matches), India 4 (4).

Football (soccer)
2011 FIFA Women's World Cup qualification (UEFA): (teams in strike are eliminated)
Group 1:  2–1 
Standings:  18 points (6 matches),  15 (6),  7 (6), Estonia 6 (5), Northern Ireland 3 (5),  1 (6)
UEFA Women's Under-19 Championship:
Final:  2–1 
France win the title for the second time.

Horse racing
English Triple Crown:
Epsom Derby in Epsom, Surrey: (1) Workforce (trainer: Michael Stoute, jockey: Ryan L. Moore) (2) At First Sight (trainer: Aidan O'Brien, jockey: Seamie Heffernan) (3) Rewilding (trainer: Mahmood Al Zarooni, jockey: Frankie Dettori)
U.S. Triple Crown:
Belmont Stakes in Elmont, New York: (1) Drosselmeyer (trainer: William I. Mott, jockey: Mike E. Smith) (2) Fly Down (trainer: Nick Zito, jockey: John R. Velazquez) (3) First Dude (trainer: Dale L. Romans, jockey: Ramon A. Dominguez)

Rugby union
2011 Rugby World Cup qualifying:
European Nations Cup Champions Playoff Series:
Round 5, second leg (first leg score in parentheses):
 61–7 (33–3)  in Botoşani. Romania win 94–10 on aggregate.
Romania advance to the Final Place Play-off.
Mid-year Tests:
Week 2:
 49–3  in Canberra
 31–34  in Cardiff
Churchill Cup:
Pool matches in Glendale, Colorado:
Pool A:  6–48 
Pool B:  39–22 
IRB Junior World Championship in Argentina:
Pool A:
 22–13 
 11–44 
Pool B:
 25–22 
 22–48 
Pool C:
 14–40 
 34–13

Tennis
Grand Slams:
French Open in Paris, France:
Women's singles final:
Francesca Schiavone  [17] def. Samantha Stosur  [7] 6–4, 7–6(2)
Schiavone becomes the first Italian woman to win a Grand Slam event in singles, and the first Italian to do so since Adriano Panatta at the 1976 French Open.
Men's doubles final:
Daniel Nestor  / Nenad Zimonjić  [2] def. Lukáš Dlouhý  / Leander Paes  [3] 7–5, 6–2
Nestor and Zimonjić win their third Grand Slam title as a team, while Nestor also has three titles with former partner Mark Knowles.
Boys' doubles final:
Duilio Beretta  / Roberto Quiroz  [7] def. Facundo Argüello  / Agustín Velotti  6–3, 6–2
Girls' doubles final:
Tímea Babos  / Sloane Stephens  [5] def. Lara Arruabarrena-Vecino  / María-Teresa Torró-Flor  6–2, 6–3
Women's legends doubles final:
Martina Navratilova  / Jana Novotná  def. Iva Majoli  / Nathalie Tauziat  6–4, 6–2

Volleyball
FIVB World League, Week 1: (teams in bold advance to final round)
Pool A:
 0–3 
 3–2 
Standings: Brazil 5 points (2 matches), Netherlands 3 (1), Bulgaria 1 (2), South Korea 0 (1).
Pool B:  3–2 
Standings: Italy 5 points (2 matches),  3 (1), France 1 (2),  0 (1).
Pool C:
 3–1 
 2–3 
Standings: Russia 6 points (2 matches), Egypt 2 (1), Finland 1 (1), USA 0 (2).
Pool D:
 3–1 
 3–2 
Standings: Cuba 5 points (2 matches), Germany 3 (1), Argentina 1 (2), Poland 0 (1).
Men's European League, Week 1:
Pool A:
 1–3 
 2–3 
Standings: Romania 4 points (2 matches), Slovakia 2 (1), Spain 2 (2), Great Britain 1 (1).
Pool B:
 1–3 
 0–3 
Standings: Greece, Austria 3 points (2 matches), Portugal 2 (1), Turkey 1 (1).
Women's European League, Week 1:
Pool A:  0–3

June 4, 2010 (Friday)

Athletics
IAAF Diamond League:
Bislett Games in Oslo, Norway:
Men:
100m: Asafa Powell  9.72
400m hurdles: Kerron Clement  48.12
800m: David Rudisha  1:42.04
1 mile: Asbel Kiprop  3:49.56
5000m: Imane Merga  12:53.81
Javelin: Andreas Thorkildsen  86.00m
Pole vault: Renaud Lavillenie  5.80m
Shot put: Christian Cantwell  21.31m
Women:
100m hurdles: Lolo Jones  12.66
200m: Carmelita Jeter  22.54
400m: Amantle Montsho  50.34
3000m steeplechase: Milcah Chemos Cheywa  9:12.66
Discus: Nadine Müller  63.93m
High jump: Blanka Vlašić  2.01m
Long jump: Olga Kucherenko  6.91m

Baseball
 Major League Baseball news:
 The Baltimore Orioles become the second MLB team this season to fire their manager, axing Dave Trembley after starting the season with a 15–39 record, the worst in MLB. Juan Samuel is named as interim manager. (AP via ESPN)

Basketball
 Russian Super League Final (best-of-5 series):
Game 2: CSKA Moscow 69–54 Khimki Moscow Region. CSKA Moscow lead series 2–0.

Cricket
Bangladesh in England:
2nd Test in Manchester, day 1:
 275/5 (83 overs); .

Equestrianism
Show jumping
Meydan FEI Nations Cup:
FEI Nations Cup of Switzerland in St. Gallen (CSIO 5*):   (Kevin Staut on Kraque Boom, Penelope Leprevost on Topinambour, Nicolas Delmotte on Luccianno, Olivier Guillon on Lord De Theize)   (Marco Kutscher on Cash, Carsten-Otto Nagel on Corradina, Ludger Beerbaum on Gotha, Marcus Ehning on Plot Blue)   (Peter Charles on Murkas Pom D'Ami, Ben Maher on Robin Hood W, Michael Whitaker on GIG Amai, John Whitaker on Peppermill)
Standings (after 3 of 8 competitions): (1)  30 points (2)  18.5 (3)  16.5

Football (soccer)
2011 European Under-21 Championship qualification: (teams in strike are eliminated)
Group 6:  0–1 
Standings: Sweden 13 points (5 matches),  13 (6), Israel 10 (6),  5 (8),  4 (7)

Ice hockey
Stanley Cup Finals (best-of-7 series):
Game 4: Philadelphia Flyers 5, Chicago Blackhawks 3. Series tied 2–2.

Rugby union
Mid-year Tests:
Week 2:
 23–29 Barbarians in Limerick

Tennis
Grand Slams:
French Open in Paris, France:
Men's singles, semifinals:
Rafael Nadal  [2] def. Jürgen Melzer  [22] 6–2, 6–3, 7–6(6)
Nadal reaches the final for the fifth time in six years.
Robin Söderling  [5] def. Tomáš Berdych  [15] 6–3, 3–6, 5–7, 6–3, 6–3
Söderling reaches the final for the second successive year.
Women's doubles final:
Serena Williams  / Venus Williams  [1] def. Květa Peschke  / Katarina Srebotnik  6–2, 6–3
The Williams sisters win their 12th Grand Slam doubles title and second at the French Open. With the victory, the sisters now hold all four Women's doubles Grand Slams.
Wheelchair men's singles final:
Shingo Kunieda  [1] def. Stefan Olsson  6–4, 6–0
Kunieda wins his tenth Grand Slam and fourth French Open title in singles.
Wheelchair women's singles final:
Esther Vergeer  [1] def. Sharon Walraven  6–0, 6–0
Vergeer wins her 15th Grand Slam and fourth French Open title in singles.
Wheelchair men's doubles final:
Stéphane Houdet  / Shingo Kunieda  [1] def. Robin Ammerlaan  / Stefan Olsson  6–0, 5–7, [10–8]
Houdet wins his fourth Grand Slam and first French Open title in doubles, and Kunieda wins his ninth Grand Slam and second French Open title in doubles.
Wheelchair women's doubles final:
Daniela Di Toro  / Aniek van Koot  [1] def. Esther Vergeer  / Sharon Walraven  [2] 3–6, 6–3, [10–4]
Di Toro and van Koot win their first Grand Slam title in doubles.

Volleyball
FIVB World League, Week 1:  (teams in bold advance to final round)
Pool A:  3–1 
Pool B:
 3–0 
 3–0 
Pool C:  3–0 
Pool D:  3–1 
Men's European League, Week 1:
Pool A:  1–3 
Pool B:  3–2

June 3, 2010 (Thursday)

Basketball
 NBA Finals (best-of-7 series):
Game 1: Los Angeles Lakers 102, Boston Celtics 89. Lakers lead series 1–0.
 Russian Super League Final (best-of-5 series):
Game 1: CSKA Moscow 89–58 Khimki Moscow Region. CSKA Moscow lead series 1–0.
 Novo Basquete Brasil Finals (best-of-5 series):
Game 4: Flamengo 94–74 Universo/BRB. Series tied 2–2.
 Premier A Slovenian Basketball League Finals (best-of-5 series):
Game 3: Union Olimpija 74–76 Krka. Krka lead series 2–1.

Cricket
South Africa in West Indies:
5th ODI in Port of Spain, Trinidad:
 252/6 (50 overs);  255/9 (49.4 overs). South Africa win by 1 wicket; win 5-match series 5–0.
Tri-nation series in Zimbabwe:
Group stage:
 194/9 (50 overs);  197/3 (38.2 overs) in Harare. Zimbabwe win by 7 wickets.
Standings: Zimbabwe 9 points (3 matches),  5 (2), India 4 (3).

Tennis
Grand Slams:
French Open in Paris, France:
Women's singles, semifinals:
Samantha Stosur  [7] def. Jelena Janković  [4] 6–1, 6–2
Stosur reaches the final of a Grand Slam for the first time in singles, and becomes the first Australian woman to reach a Grand Slam singles final since Evonne Goolagong Cawley won the 1980 Wimbledon Championships.
Francesca Schiavone  [17] def. Elena Dementieva  [5] 7–6(3) retired
Schiavone becomes the first Italian woman to reach a Grand Slam singles final.
Mixed doubles final:
Katarina Srebotnik  / Nenad Zimonjić  [6] def. Yaroslava Shvedova  / Julian Knowle  4–6, 7–6(5), [11–9]
Srebotnik and Zimonjić both win their fourth Grand Slam mixed doubles title.

June 2, 2010 (Wednesday)

Basketball
 Turkish Basketball League Finals (best-of-7 series):
Game 6: Fenerbahçe Ülker 76–51 Efes Pilsen. Fenerbahçe Ülker win series 4–2.
Fenerbahçe Ülker win the championship for the fourth time.
 A1 Ethniki Final (best-of-5 series):
Game 3: Panathinaikos 79–70 Olympiacos. Panathinaikos lead series 2–1.
 National Basketball League Final (best-of-7 series):
Game 4: Prostějov 60–90 Nymburk. Nymburk lead series 3–1.
 Premier A Slovenian Basketball League Finals (best-of-5 series):
Game 2: Krka 74–66 Union Olimpija. Series tied 1–1.

Football (soccer)
UEFA Women's Under-19 Championship:
Semifinals:
 1–1 (3–5 pen.) 
 0–0 (4–5 pen.)

Ice hockey
Stanley Cup Finals (best-of-7 series):
Game 3: Philadelphia Flyers 4, Chicago Blackhawks 3 (OT). Blackhawks lead series 2–1.

Tennis
Grand Slams:
French Open in Paris, France:
Men's singles, quarterfinals:
Rafael Nadal  [2] def. Nicolás Almagro  [19] 7–6(2), 7–6(3), 6–4
Jürgen Melzer  [22] def. Novak Djokovic  [3] 3–6, 2–6, 6–2, 7–6(3), 6–4
Melzer reaches the semi-final of a Grand Slam for the first time.
Women's singles, quarterfinals:
Samantha Stosur  [7] def. Serena Williams  [1] 6–2, 6–7(2), 8–6
Jelena Janković  [4] def. Yaroslava Shvedova  7–5, 6–4

June 1, 2010 (Tuesday)

Basketball
 National Basketball League Final (best-of-7 series):
Game 3: Prostějov 86–74 Nymburk. Nymburk lead series 2–1.

Cricket
Tri-nation series in Zimbabwe:
Group stage:
 118 (24.5/26 overs);  119/1 (15.2 overs) in Bulawayo. Sri Lanka win by 9 wickets.
Standings (after 2 matches): Sri Lanka 5 points, Zimbabwe 4.

Tennis
Grand Slams:
French Open in Paris, France:
Men's singles, quarterfinals:
Robin Söderling  [5] def. Roger Federer  [1] 3–6, 6–3, 7–5, 6–4
Federer fails to make the semi-final of a Grand Slam for the first time since the 2004 French Open.
Tomáš Berdych  [15] def. Mikhail Youzhny  [11] 6–3, 6–1, 6–2
Berdych reach his first Grand Slam semifinal.
Women's singles, quarterfinals:
Francesca Schiavone  [17] def. Caroline Wozniacki  [3] 6–2, 6–3
Schiavone becomes the first Italian woman to reach a Grand Slam semifinal since 1954.
Elena Dementieva  [5] def. Nadia Petrova  [19] 2–6, 6–2, 6–0

References

VI